= Bhandardaha =

- Census Town
- Location in West Bengal, India Bhandardaha (India)
- Coordinates: 22.62°N 88.21°E
- Country: India
- State: West Bengal
- District: Howrah
- Elevation: 12 m (39 ft)

Population (2011)
  - Total: 5,667

Languages
  - Official: Bengali, English
- Time zone: UTC+5:30 (IST)
- Vehicle registration: WB
- Lok Sabha constituency: Sreerampur
- Vidhan Sabha constituency: Domjur
- Website: howrah.gov.in

Bhandardaha is a census town in Domjur CD Block of Howrah Sadar subdivision in Howrah district in the state of West Bengal, India.

== Geography ==
Bhandardaha is located at 22.62°N 88.21°E. It has an average elevation of 12 metres (39 feet).

== Demographics ==
As per 2011 Census of India, Bhandardaha had a total population of 5,667 of which 2,873 (51%) were males and 2,794 (49%) were females. Population below 6 years was 592. The total number of literates in Bhandardaha was 4,143 (81.64% of the population over 6 years).

Bhandardaha was part of Kolkata Urban Agglomeration in 2011 census.

As of 2001 India census, Bhandardaha had a population of 4816. Males constitute 50% of the population and females 50%. Bhandardaha has an average literacy rate of 65%, higher than the national average of 59.5%; with male literacy of 70% and female literacy of 60%. 11% of the population is under 6 years of age.

== Transport ==
=== Bus ===
Amta Road (part of State Highway 15) is the artery of the town.

==== Private Bus ====
- 63 Domjur - Howrah Station
- E44 Rampur - Howrah Station
- K11 Domjur - Rabindra Sadan

==== Mini Bus ====
- 16 Domjur - Howrah Station
- 31 Makardaha - Khidirpur
- 34 Purash - Howrah Station
- 35 Hantal - Howrah Station

==== CTC Bus ====
- C11 Domjur - B.B.D. Bagh/Belgachia
- C11/1 Munsirhat - Howrah Station

==== Bus Routes Without Numbers ====
- Bargachia - Sealdah Station (Barafkal)
- Pancharul - Howrah Station
- Udaynarayanpur - Howrah Station
- Rajbalhat - Howrah Station
- Tarakeswar - Howrah Station

=== Train ===
Makardaha railway station and Domjur Road railway station on Howrah-Amta line are the nearest railway stations.
