= Kantlia =

- Census Town
- Location in West Bengal, India Kantlia (India)
- Coordinates: 22.61°N 88.25°E
- Country: India
- State: West Bengal
- District: Howrah

Population (2011)
  - Total: 9,567

Languages
  - Official: Bengali, English
- Time zone: UTC+5:30 (IST)
- Vehicle registration: WB
- Lok Sabha constituency: Serampore
- Vidhan Sabha constituency: Domjur
- Website: howrah.gov.in

Kantlia is a census town in Domjur CD Block of Howrah Sadar subdivision in Howrah district in the Indian state of West Bengal.

== Geography ==
Kantlia is located at 22°36′56″N 88°15′08″E.

== Demographics ==
As per 2011 Census of India Kantlia had a total population of 9,567 of which 4,879 (51%) were males and 4,688 (49%) were females. Population below 6 years was 1,054. The total number of literates in Kantlia was 6,846 (80.42% of the population over 6 years).

Kantlia was part of Kolkata Urban Agglomeration in 2011 census.

As of 2001 India census, Kantlia had a population of 7371. Males constitute 52% of the population and females 48%. Kantlia has an average literacy rate of 67%, higher than the national average of 59.5%: male literacy is 73% and female literacy is 61%. In Kantlia, 13% of the population is under 6 years of age.

== Transport ==
=== Bus ===
Amta Road (part of State Highway 15) is the artery of the town.

==== Private Bus ====
- 63 Domjur - Howrah Station
- E44 Rampur - Howrah Station
- K11 Domjur - Rabindra Sadan

==== Mini Bus ====
- 16 Domjur - Howrah Station
- 31 Makardaha - Khidirpur
- 34 Purash - Howrah Station
- 35 Hantal - Howrah Station

==== CTC Bus ====
- C11 Domjur - B.B.D. Bagh/Belgachia
- C11/1 Munsirhat - Howrah Station

==== Bus Routes Without Numbers ====
- Bargachia - Sealdah Station (Barafkal)
- Pancharul - Howrah Station
- Udaynarayanpur - Howrah Station
- Rajbalhat - Howrah Station
- Tarakeswar - Howrah Station

=== Train ===
Dansi railway station and Jhaluarbar railway station are the nearest railway stations on Howrah-Amta line.
