= Domjur (community development block) =

- Community development block
- Location in West Bengal
- Coordinates: 22°38′N 88°13′E
- Country: India
- State: West Bengal
- District: Howrah
- Parliamentary constituency: Sreerampur
- Assembly constituency: Domjur, Jagatballavpur

Area
  - Total: 22.52 sq mi (58.33 km^{2})
- Elevation: 26 ft (8 m)

Population (2011)
  - Total: 377,588
  - Density: 16,770/sq mi (6,473/km^{2})
- Time zone: UTC+5.30 (IST)
- PIN: 711405 (Domjur); 711409 (Makardaha)
- Area code: 03214
- Vehicle registration: WB-11, WB-12, WB-13, WB-14
- Literacy Rate: 81.33 per cent
- Website: http://howrah.gov.in/

Domjur is a community development block that forms an administrative division in Howrah Sadar subdivision of Howrah district in the Indian state of West Bengal.

== Geography ==
=== Location ===
Domjur is located at 22°38′N 88°13′E.

Domjur CD Block is bounded by Chanditala I and Chanditala II CD Blocks, in Hooghly district, in the north, Bally Jagachha CD Block in the east, Sankrail CD Block in the south and Panchla and Jagatballavpur CD Blocks in the west.

It is located 12 km from Howrah, the district headquarters.

=== Area and administration ===
Domjur CD Block has an area of 58.33 km^{2}. Domjur Police Station of Howrah City Police serves this CD Block. Domjur panchayat samity has 18 gram panchayats. The block has 38 inhabited villages. Headquarters of this block is at Domjur.

Map of Howrah District

=== Topography ===
Howrah district is located on the west bank of the Hooghly. The Rupnarayan flows on the west and south of the district and the Damodar intersects it. The district consists of a flat alluvial plain.

=== Gram panchayats ===
Gram panchayats of Domjur block/panchayat samiti are: Bankra I, Bankra II, Bankra III, Begari, Dakshin Jhapardaha, Domjur, Kolora I, Kolora II, Mahiyari I, Mahiyari II, Makardah I, Makardah II, Narna, Parbatipur, Rudrapur, Salap I, Salap II and Uttar Jhapardaha.

== Demographics ==
=== Overview ===
Rural population is 49.63% of the total population of Howrah district as per 2001 census. Scheduled castes account for 15.41% of the population, scheduled tribes 0.44% and Muslims 24.4% of the population. As the economy is prevalently industrial, majority of the population depends on industries for a living. Only 30% of the population is engaged in cultivation.

BPL families in CD Blocks
of Howrah district
Howrah Sadar subdivision
Bally Jagachha – 4.35%
Domjur – 7.21%
Panchla – 1.82%
Sankrail – 5.67%
Jagatballavpur – 10.35%
Uluberia subdivision
Uluberia I – 23.38%
Uluberia II – 19.76%
Amta I – 16.07%
Amta II – 16.38%
Udaynarayanpur – 14.12%
Bagnan I – 18.87%
Bagnan II – 21.18%
Shyampur I – 36.51%
Shyampur II – 17.85%
Source: Rural Household
Survey 2005

=== Population ===
As per 2011 Census of India Domjur CD Block had a total population of 377,588, of which 74,510 were rural and 303,078 were uban. There were 192,199 (51%) males and 185,389 (49%) females. Population below 6 years was 41,978. Scheduled Castes numbered 65,202 and Scheduled Tribes numbered 1,587.

As per 2001 census, Domjur block had a total population of 311,133, out of which 158,451 were males and 152,682 were females. Domjur block registered a population growth of 22.10 per cent during the 1991-2001 decade. Decadal growth for Howrah district was 12.76 per cent. Decadal growth in West Bengal was 17.84 per cent. Scheduled castes at 70,844 formed over one-fifth the population. Scheduled tribes numbered 4,870.

=== Census Towns and large villages ===
Census Towns in Domjur CD Block (2011 census figures brackets): Uttar Jhapardaha (8,425), Dafarpur (5,461), Baluhati (4,363), Domjur (18,433), Dakshin Jhapardaha (13,704), Rudrapur (6,810), Khantora (6,547), Bhandardaha (5,667), Makardaha (8,713), Kantlia (9,567), Tentulkuli (7,203), Salap (15,171), Bankra (63,957), Nibra (27,818), Ankurhati (11,130), Bipra Noapara (9,408), Begari (5,505), Kesabpur (12,073), Oadipur (5,002), Natibpur (7,212), Kalara (27,210), Baniara (5,476) and Mahiari (18,223).

The following Municipalities and Census Towns in Howrah district were part of Kolkata Urban Agglomeration in 2011 census: Howrah (Municipal Corporation), Bally (Municipality) (now amalgamed with Howrah Municipal Corporation), Bally (Census Town), Jagadishpur (CT), Chamrail (CT), Eksara (CT), Chakapara (CT) Khalia (CT), Jaypur Bil (CT), (all, except Howrah municipal corporation and Bally municipality, in Bally Jagachha CD Block), Bankra (CT), Nibra (CT), Mahiari (CT), Bipra Noapara (CT), Ankurhati (CT), Kantlia (CT), Salap (CT), Tentulkuli (CT), Domjur (CT), Dakshin Jhapardaha (CT), Makardaha (CT), Khantora (CT), Bhandardaha (CT), (all in Domjur CD Block), Kamranga (CT), Argari (CT), Andul (CT), Ramchandrapur (CT), Jhorhat (CT), Hatgachha (CT), Dhuilya (CT), Panchpara (CT), Podara (CT), Banupur (CT), Sankrail (CT), Manikpur (CT), Sarenga (CT), Raghudebbati (CT) Nalpur (CT), Chak Srikrishna (Out Growth), (all in Sankrail CD Block), Uluberia (M) Khalisani (CT) Uttar Pirpur (CT) Balaram Pota (CT), Santoshpur (CT) (all except Uluberia municipality in Uluberia II CD Block).

Large villages in Domjur CD Block (2011 census figures in brackets): Parbbatipur (4,586), Khas Mara (5,298), Sankharidaha (4,021), Prasastha (4,255), Narna (5,518) and Laksmanpur (4,596).

=== Literacy ===
As per 2011 census the total number of literates in Domjur CD Block was 272,940 (81.33% of the population over 6 years) out of which 143,796 (53%) were males and 129,144 (47%) were females.

As per 2011 census, literacy in Howrah district was 78.66%. Literacy in West Bengal was 77.08% in 2011. Literacy in India in 2011 was 74.04%.

As per 2001 census, Domjur block had a total literacy of 75.06 per cent for the 6+ age group. While male literacy was 80.47 per cent female literacy was 69.43 per cent. Howrah district had a total literacy of 77.01 per cent, male literacy being 83.22 per cent and female literacy being 70.11 per cent.

Literacy in CD blocks of
Howrah district
Howrah Sadar subdivision
Bally Jagachha – 87.75%
Domjur – 81.33%
Panchla – 78.98%
Sankrail – 83.11%
Jagatballavpur – 79.22%
Uluberia subdivision
Uluberia I – 77.39%
Uluberia II – 78.05%
Amta I – 81.26%
Amta II – 81.47%
Udaynarayanpur – 81.05%
Bagnan I – 84.09%
Bagnan II – 82.57%
Shyampur I – 78.96%
Shyampur II – 80.49%
Source: 2011 Census: CD Block Wise
Primary Census Abstract Data

=== Language ===
Bengali is the local language in these areas.

=== Religion ===
Religion in Domjur CD block (2011)
Hinduism	62.32%
Islam	36.75%
Other or not stated	0.93%

In 2011 census Hindus numbered 235,311 and formed 62.32% of the population in Domjur CD Block. Muslims numbered 138,779 and formed 36.75% of the population. Others numbered 3,498 and formed 0.93% of the population. Christians numbered 715 and 2,221 persons did not state their religion.

In 2011, Hindus numbered 3,535,844 and formed 72.90% of the population in Howrah district. Muslims numbered 1,270,641 and formed 26.20% of the population. In West Bengal Hindus numbered 64,385,546 and formed 70.53% of the population. Muslims numbered 24,654,825 and formed 27.01% of the population.

Languages of Domjur CD block (2011)
1. Bengali (91.3%)
2. Hindi (6.20%)
3. Urdu (1.98%)
4. Others (0.47%)

At the time of the 2011 census, 91.35% of the population spoke Bengali, 6.20% Hindi and 1.98% Urdu as their first language.

== Economy ==
=== Infrastructure ===
Prior to 2003-04, Domjur CD Block had 60 hectares of vested land, out of which 45 hectares were distributed amongst 694 persons. In Domjur CD Block more than one crop was grown in 2,543 hectares. Net area sown in the block was 6,767 hectares. Domjur had 2,265 hectares of canals for irrigation. In Domjur CD Block 39 mouzas were electrified up to March 2004.

== Education ==
In 2003-04, Domjur CD Block had 153 primary schools with 26,321 students, 3 middle schools with 1,251 students, 24 high schools with 16,195 students and 12 higher secondary schools with 12,471 students. Domjur CD Block had 1 general college with 415 students. Domjur CD Block had 255 institutions with 28,729 students for special and non-formal education. It had 2 mass literacy centres.

== Healthcare ==
Domjur CD Block had 4 health centres, 9 clinics, 4 dispensaries and 1 hospital with 49 beds and 49 doctors in 2003. It had 43 family welfare centres.
