= Dakshin Jhapardaha =

- Census Town
- Location in West Bengal, India Dakshin Jhapardaha (India)
- Coordinates: 22.63°N 88.20°E
- Country: India
- State: West Bengal
- District: Howrah

Population (2011)
  - Total: 13,704

Languages
  - Official: Bengali, English
- Time zone: UTC+5:30 (IST)
- Vehicle registration: WB
- Lok Sabha constituency: Sreerampur
- Vidhan Sabha constituency: Jagatballavpur
- Website: howrah.gov.in

Dakshin Jhapardaha is a census town in Domjur CD Block of Howrah Sadar subdivision in Howrah district in the state of West Bengal, India.

== Geography ==
Dakshin Jhapardaha is located at 22°37′58″N 88°12′26″E

== Demographics ==
As per 2011 Census of India Dakshin Jhapardaha had a total population of 13,704 of which 6,892 (50%) were males and 6,812 (50%) were females. Population below 6 years was 1,306. The total number of literates in Dakshin Jhapardaha was 10,546 (85.06% of the population over 6 years).

Dakshin Jhapardaha was part of Kolkata Urban Agglomeration in 2011 census.

As of 2001 India census, Dakshin Jhapardaha had a population of 11,439. Males constitute 50% of the population and females 50%. Dakshin Jhapardaha has an average literacy rate of 73%, higher than the national average of 59.5%: male literacy is 77% and female literacy is 69%. In Dakshin Jhapardaha, 10% of the population is under 6 years of age.

== Transport ==
Amta Road (part of State Highway 15) is the artery of the town.

=== Bus ===
==== Private Bus ====
- 63 Domjur - Howrah Station
- E44 Rampur - Howrah Station
- K11 Domjur - Rabindra Sadan

==== Mini Bus ====
- 16 Domjur - Howrah Station
- 34 Purash - Howrah Station
- 35 Hantal - Howrah Station

==== CTC Bus ====
- C11 Domjur - B.B.D. Bagh/Belgachia
- C11/1 Munsirhat - Howrah Station

==== Bus Routes Without Numbers ====
- Bargachia - Sealdah Station (Barafkal)
- Pancharul - Howrah Station
- Udaynarayanpur - Howrah Station
- Rajbalhat - Howrah Station
- Tarakeswar - Howrah Station

=== Train ===
Domjur Road railway station on Howrah-Amta line is the nearest railway station.
