= Bankra =

- Census Town
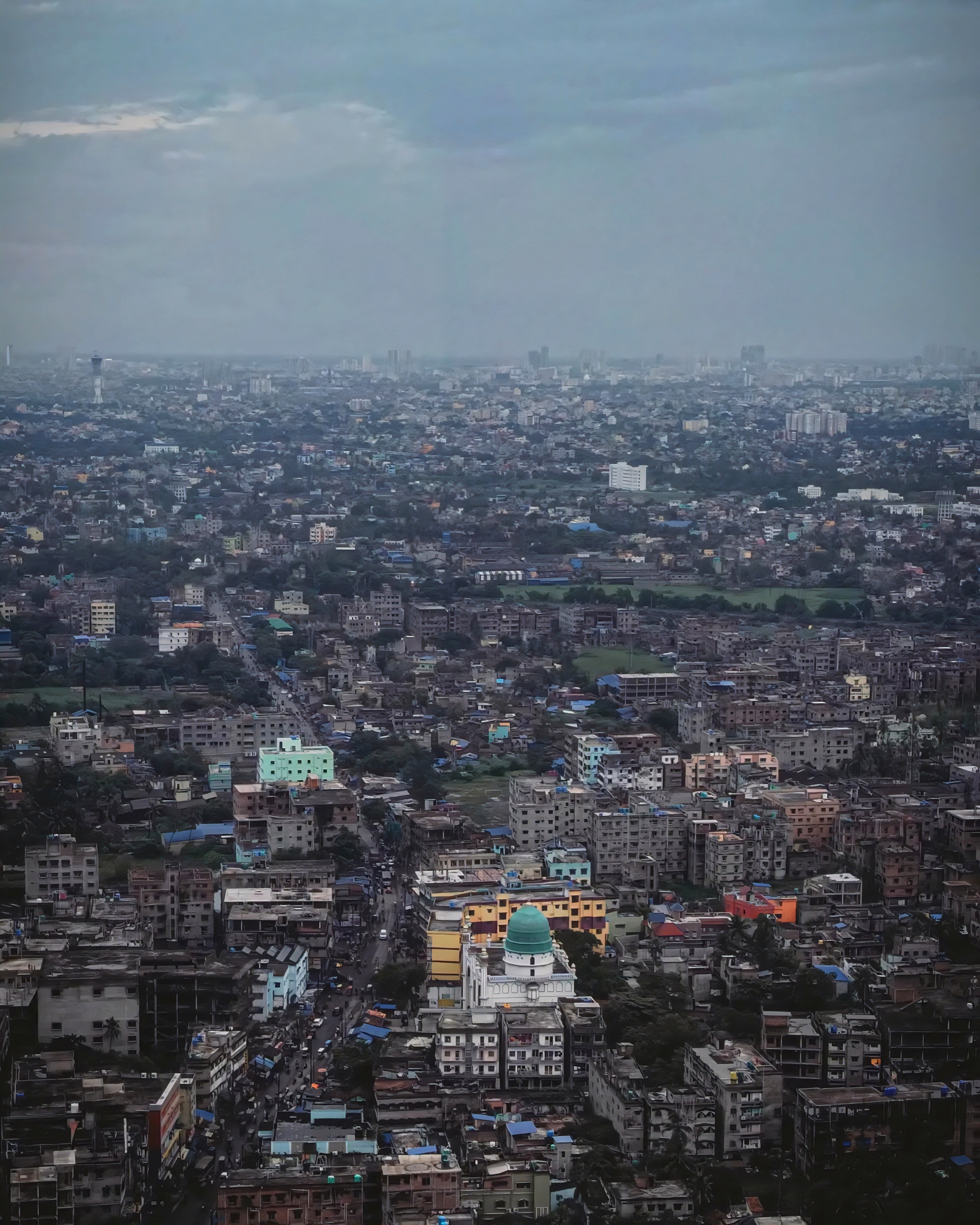
- Aerial view of Bankra

- Location in West Bengal, India Bankra (West Bengal) Bankra (India)
- Coordinates: 22.60860°N 88.279686°E
- Country: India
- State: West Bengal
- District: Howrah
- Elevation: 8 m (26 ft)

Population (2011)
  - Total: 63,957

Languages
  - Official: Hindi, Bengali, English, Santali
- Time zone: UTC+5:30 (IST)
- PIN: 711403
- Vehicle registration: WB
- Lok Sabha constituency: Sreerampur
- Vidhan Sabha constituency: Domjur
- Website: howrah.gov.in

Bankra is a census town in Domjur CD Block of Howrah Sadar subdivision in Howrah district in the Indian state of West Bengal.

== Geography ==
Bankra is located at 22.6029°N 88.2775°E. It has an average elevation of 8 metres (26 feet).

== Demographics ==
As per 2011 Census of India Bankra had a total population of 63,957 of which 33,079 (52%) were males and 30,878 (48%) were females. Population below 6 years was 8,911. The total number of literates in Bankra was 41,560 (75.50% of the population over 6 years).Minority Muslim community over 70% in this town .

Bankra was part of Kolkata Urban Agglomeration in 2011 census. It is surrounded by Balitikuri, Jagacha, Salap, Santragachi and Ankurihati.

As of 2001 India census, Bankra had a population of 48,403. Males constitute 52% of the population and females 48%. 15% of the population is under 6 years of age.

=== Languages ===
Bankra is linguistically diverse, but Hindi is the dominant language of the region and is widely used in daily communication. Bengali is also commonly spoken, especially among migrant communities. In addition, a few other languages such as Santali and Kurukh spoken by certain tribals. Languages like Magahi are used in local traders, reflecting the area's cultural and occupational diversity.

== Transport ==
Makardaha Road is the artery of the town.

Moukhali Road

=== Bus ===
==== Private Bus ====
- 63 Domjur - Howrah Station
- E43 Dihibhursut - Howrah Station
- E44 Rampur - Howrah Station
- E53 Narit - Howrah Station
- L3 Jhikhira/Muchighata - Howrah Station

==== Mini Bus ====
- 16 Domjur - Howrah Station
- 27 Bankra - Park Circus
- 31 Makardaha - Khidirpur
- 34 Purash - Howrah Station
- 35 Hantal - Howrah Station

==== CTC Bus ====
- C11/1 Munsirhat - Howrah Station

==== Bus Routes Without Numbers ====
- Pancharul - Howrah Station
- Udaynarayanpur - Howrah Station
- Rajbalhat - Howrah Station
- Tarakeswar - Howrah Station

=== Train ===
Dasnagar, Dansi and Bankra Nayabaz railway station are the nearest railway stations.

== Educational Institutions ==
=== Government School ===
- Bankra Islamia High School
- Bankra Badamtala Girls High School
- Bankra Mishrapara Primary School

=== Private School ===
- Kishalaya Children Centre For Elementari Education
- Muktadhara Shishupatha Bhaban School
- St. Francis Assisi School School
- Nava Vibha Hindi Vidyalay School

== Non-Government Organisations ==
- Bankra Matri Sangha
- Margastha Research Foundation (Balitikuri)

== Government and Non-Government Healthcare Institutions ==
- Bankra Swasthya Kendra
- Benuban Health Care And Diagnostic Centre
- Sanjeevani Nursing Home
- Maxcare Nursing Home
- Bankra Central nursing home
- Akash Deep Diagnostic Centre
