= Bipra Noapara =

- Census Town
- Location in West Bengal, India Bipra Noapara (India)
- Coordinates: 22.60°N 88.22°E
- Country: India
- State: West Bengal
- District: Howrah

Population (2011)
  - Total: 9,408

Languages
  - Official: Bengali, English
- Time zone: UTC+5:30 (IST)
- Vehicle registration: WB
- Lok Sabha constituency: Sreerampur
- Vidhan Sabha constituency: Domjur
- Website: howrah.gov.in

Bipra Noapara is a census town in Domjur CD Block of Howrah Sadar subdivision in Howrah district in the Indian state of West Bengal.

== Geography ==
Bipra Noapara is located at 22°36′16″N 88°13′19″E

== Demographics ==
As per 2011 Census of India Bipra Noapara had a total population of 9,408 of which 4,753 (50%) were males and 4,665 (50%) were females. Population below 6 years was 1,010. The total number of literates in Bipra Noapara was 6,673 (79.46% of the population over 6 years).

Bipra Noapara was part of Kolkata Urban Agglomeration in 2011 census.

As of 2001 India census, Bipra Noapara had a population of 8,996. Males constitute 54% of the population and females 46%. Bipra Noapara has an average literacy rate of 67%, higher than the national average of 59.5%; with male literacy of 74% and female literacy of 58%. 11% of the population is under 6 years of age.

== Transport ==
Makardaha railway station and Domjur Road railway station are the nearest railway stations.
