= Jangipara =

- Village
- Location in West Bengal, India Jangipara (India)
- Coordinates: 22°44′30″N 88°3′5″E
- Country: India
- State: West Bengal
- District: Hooghly

Government
  - Body: Gram panchayat

Population (2011)
  - Total: 2,700

Languages
  - Official: Bengali, English
- Time zone: UTC+5:30 (IST)
- ISO 3166 code: IN-WB
- Vehicle registration: WB
- Website: wb.gov.in

Jangipara is a village in Jangipara CD Block in Srirampore subdivision of Hooghly district in the Indian state of West Bengal.

== Geography ==
Cities and towns in Chanditala I, Chanditala II and Jangipara CD Blocks in Srirampore subdivision in Hooghly district
M: municipal city/ town, CT: census town, R: rural/ urban centre,
Owing to space constraints in the small map, the actual locations in a larger map may vary slightly

=== Location ===
Jangipara is located at 22°44′30″N 88°3′5″E.

=== Police station ===
Jangipara police station has jurisdiction over the Jangipara CD Block.

=== CD Block HQ ===
The headquarters of Jangipara CD Block are located at Jangipara.

=== Urbanisation ===
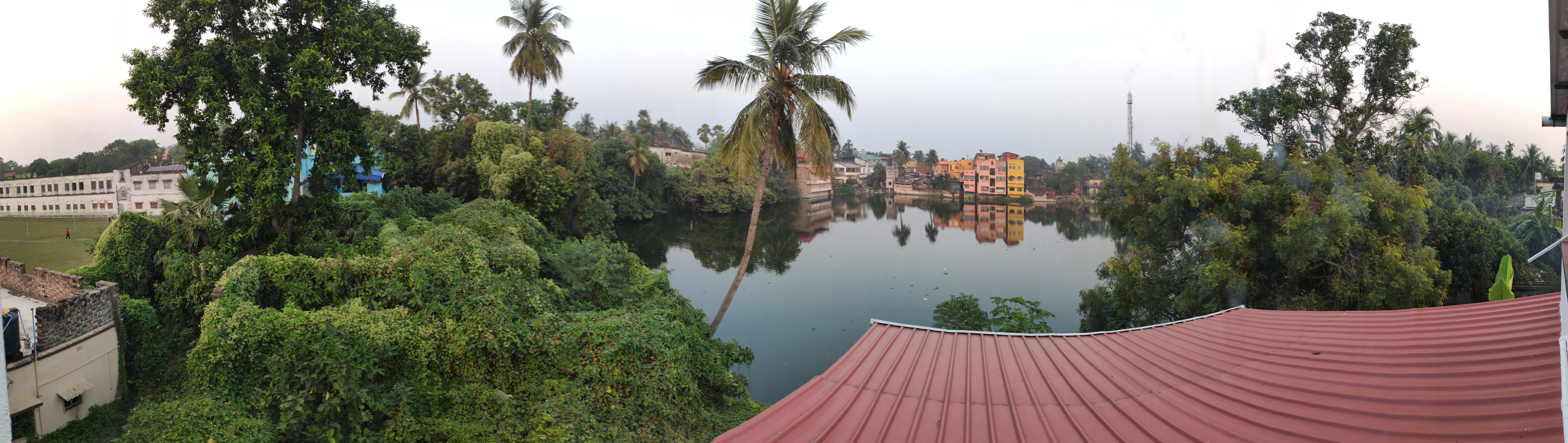
Jangipara Hat Pukur And Bibhutibhushan Bandopadhyay's Quarter - Panorama

Srirampore subdivision is the most urbanized of the subdivisions in Hooghly district. 73.13% of the population in the subdivision is urban and 26.88% is rural. The subdivision has 6 municipalities and 34 census towns. The municipalities are: Uttarpara Kotrung Municipality, Konnagar Municipality, Serampore Municipality, Baidyabati Municipality, Rishra Municipality and Dankuni Municipality. Amongst the CD Blocks in the subdivision, Uttarapara Serampore (census towns shown in a separate map) had 76% urban population, Chanditala I 42%, Chanditala II 69% and Jangipara 7% (census towns shown in the map above). All places marked in the map are linked in the larger full screen map.

== Demographics ==
As per 2011 Census of India Jangipara had a population of 2,700 of which 1,343 (50%) were males and 1,357 (50%) were females. Population below 6 years was 241. The total number of literates in Jangipara was 2,019 (82.11% of the population over 6 years).

== Education ==
Mahitosh Nandy Mahavidyalaya, a general degree college, was established at Jangipara, in 2007. It offers honours courses in Bengali, Arabic, English, Sanskrit, history, philosophy and education.

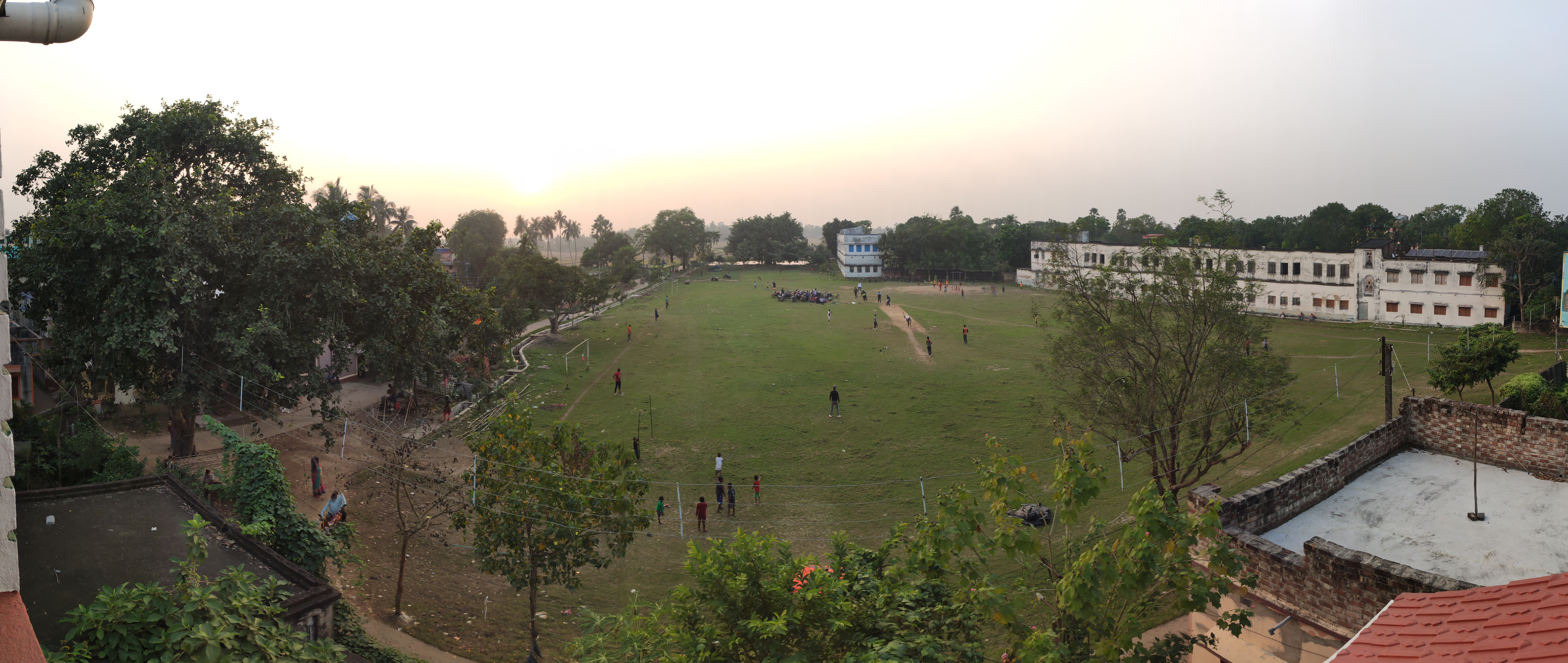
Jangipara D.N High School - Panorama

Jangipara D.N. High School is a coeducational higher secondary school at Jangipara. It has arrangements for teaching Bengali, English, Sanskrit, history, philosophy, political science, economics, eco-geography, accountancy, business economics & mathematics. Bibhutibhushan Bandopadhyay once served here as a teacher.

Jangipara Balika Vidyalaya is a girls only higher secondary school. It has arrangements for teaching Bengali, English, Sanskrit, history, philosophy, political science and education.

== Healthcare ==
Jangipara Rural Hospital functions with 60 beds.

== Transport ==
=== Bus ===
==== Private Bus ====
- 9 Haripal railway station - Udaynarayanpur
- 9A Haripal railway station - Bargachia
- 31 Jangipara - Serampore
- CTC

==== Bus Route Without Number ====
- Rajbalhat - Howrah Station
- Tarakeswar - Bargachia
- Jangipara - Chunchura Court
- Dharmatala To Jangipara And Antpur CTC

=== Train ===
Bargachia railway station and Haripal railway station are the nearest railway stations of Jangipara.
