= Mansinhapur =

Mansinghapur
- Census Town
- Location in West Bengal, India Mansinghapur (India)
- Coordinates: 22.65°N 88.15°E
- Country: India
- State: West Bengal
- District: Howrah

Population (2011)
  - Total: 6,004

Languages
  - Official: Bengali, English
- Time zone: UTC+5:30 (IST)
- Vehicle registration: WB
- Website: howrah.gov.in

Mansinghapur is a census town in Jagatballavpur CD Block of Howrah Sadar subdivision in Howrah district in the Indian state of West Bengal.

== History ==
The town is said to have been named after the Mughal general Raja Man Singh as he is believed to have set up camp here on the banks of the Gouriganga River, while on his way to Orissa on a military expedition.

== Geography ==
Mansinghapur is located at 22.65°N 88.15°E.

== Demographics ==
As per 2011 Census of India Mansinghapur had a total population of 6,004 of which 3,109 (52%) were males and 2,895 (48%) were females. Population below 6 years was 588. The total number of literates in Mansinghapur was 4,828 (89.14% of the population over 6 years).

As of 2001 India census, Mansinghapur had a population of 5401. Males constitute 52% of the population and females 48%. Mansinghapur has an average literacy rate of 76%, higher than the national average of 59.5%: male literacy is 81% and female literacy is 70%. In Mansinghapur, 11% of the population is under 6 years of age.

== Culture ==
There are two Mosque and three old Temple in this town: Dharmathakur temple in Panditpara built in 1812, Radhakantajiu temple, Raghunathjiu temple. None of the temples presently have any terracotta carvings.

== Transport ==
Amta Road (part of State Highway 15) is the artery of the town.

=== Bus ===
==== Private Bus ====
- 9A Bargachia - Haripal railway station
- E44 Rampur - Howrah Station

==== Mini Bus ====
- 34 Purash - Howrah Station
- 35 Hantal - Howrah Station

==== CTC Bus ====
- C11/1 Munsirhat - Howrah Station

==== Bus Routes Without Numbers ====
- Bargachia - Sealdah Station (Barafkal)
- Bargachia - Tarakeswar
- Pancharul - Howrah Station
- Udaynarayanpur - Howrah Station
- Rajbalhat - Howrah Station
- Tarakeswar - Howrah Station

=== Train ===
Bargachia railway station on Howra-Amta line under Kharagpur railway division of South Eastern railway zone, is the nearest railway station.
