= Kalara =

- Census Town
- Location in West Bengal, India Kalara (India)
- Coordinates: 22.59°N 88.19°E
- Country: India
- State: West Bengal
- District: Howrah

Population (2011)
  - Total: 27,210

Languages
  - Official: Bengali, English
- Time zone: UTC+5:30 (IST)
- PIN: 711411
- Vehicle registration: WB
- Lok Sabha constituency: Howrah
- Vidhan Sabha constituency: Sankrail
- Website: howrah.gov.in

Kalara is a census town in Domjur CD Block of Howrah Sadar subdivision in Howrah district in the Indian state of West Bengal.

== Geography ==
Kalara is located at 22°35′30″N 88°11′47″E

It is broadly subdivided into four zones

1. South Kolorah, has a madrasah named Majahirul Ulum Islamia Senior Madrasah, Karbala G M Primary School and Kolorah Haji Abdul Ohab Institution. There is a market named Karbala Bazar and one Primary Health Centre.
2. North Kolorah, has a Bazar, Kolorah High School and a Madrasah.
3. Maddhya (Middle) Kolorah
4. New Kolorah

== Demographics ==
As per 2011 Census of India Kalara had a total population of 27,210 of which 14,102 (52%) were males and 13,108 (48%) were females. Population below 6 years was 3,304. The total number of literates in Kalara was 19,309 (80.77% of the population over 6 years).

As of 2001 India census, Kalara had a population of 23,129. Males constitute 52% of the population and females 48%. Kalara has an average literacy rate of 64%, higher than the national average of 59.5%: male literacy is 68% and female literacy is 60%. In Kalara, 14% of the population is under 6 years of age.

Most of the people of Kolorah are zari workers and some are tailors by profession, they work in Kolkata Barabazar.

Remarkable residents:

Resident Dr. M.M. Samim is a neurologist trained at the National Institute of Mental Health and Neurosciences (NIMHANS). In 2018, he achieved All India Rank 1 in the entrance examination for the DM Neurology program.

== Transport ==
Domjur Road railway station and Sankrail railway station are the nearest railway stations.
