= Sahapur =

- Census Town
- Location in West Bengal, India Sahapur (India)
- Coordinates: 22.52°N 88.17°E
- Country: India
- State: West Bengal
- District: Howrah
- Elevation: 6 m (20 ft)

Population (2011)
  - Total: 9,022

Languages
  - Official: Bengali, English
- Time zone: UTC+5:30 (IST)
- ISO 3166 code: IN-WB
- Vehicle registration: WB
- Lok Sabha constituency: Howrah
- Vidhan Sabha constituency: Panchla
- Website: howrah.gov.in

Sahapur is a census town in Panchla CD Block of Howrah Sadar subdivision in Howrah district in the Indian state of West Bengal.

== Geography ==
Sahapur is located at 22.52°N 88.17°E. It has an average elevation of 6 metres (19 feet). Sahapur is also a small village at bankura district of west Bengal under onda police station and shantore panchyat.

== Demographics ==
As per 2011 Census of India Shahpur had a total population of 9,022 of which 4,675 (52%) were males and 4,347 (48%) were females. Population below 6 years was 3,528. The total number of literates in Shahpur was 6,247 (78.96% of the population over 6 years).

As of 2001 India census, Sahapur had a population of 7,533. Males constitute 51% of the population and females 49%. Sahapur has an average literacy rate of 66%, higher than the national average of 59.5%: male literacy is 72%, and female literacy is 60%. In Sahapur, 14% of the population is under 6 years of age.
