= Natibpur =

- Census Town
- Location in West Bengal, India Natibpur (India)
- Coordinates: 22.60168°N 88.18424°E
- Country: India
- State: West Bengal
- District: Howrah

Population (2011)
  - Total: 7,212

Languages
  - Official: Bengali, English
- Time zone: UTC+5:30 (IST)
- Vehicle registration: WB
- Lok Sabha constituency: Howrah
- Vidhan Sabha constituency: Sankrail
- Website: howrah.gov.in

Natibpur is a census town in Domjur CD Block of Howrah Sadar subdivision in Howrah district in the Indian state of West Bengal.

== Geography ==
Natibpur is located at 22.665681, 87.887652.

== Demographics ==
As per 2011 Census of India Natibpur had a total population of 7,212 of which 3,663 (51%) were males and 5,549 (49%) were females. Population below 6 years was 971. The total number of literates in Natibpur was 4,881 (78.21% of the population over 6 years).

As of 2001 India census, Natibpur had a population of 5,707. Males constitute 52% of the population and females 48%. Natibpur has an average literacy rate of 58%, lower than the national average of 59.5%: male literacy is 61%, and female literacy is 54%. In Natibpur, 17% of the population is under 6 years of age.

== Transport ==
Domjur Road railway station and Sankrail railway station are the nearest railway stations.
