= Khantora =

- Census Town
- Location in West Bengal, India Khantora (India)
- Coordinates: 22.62028°N 88.20925°E
- Country: India
- State: West Bengal
- District: Howrah

Population (2011)
  - Total: 6,547

Languages
  - Official: Bengali, English
- Time zone: UTC+5:30 (IST)
- Vehicle registration: WB
- Lok Sabha constituency: Sreerampur
- Vidhan Sabha constituency: Jagatballavpur
- Website: howrah.gov.in

Khantora is a census town in Domjur CD Block of Howrah Sadar subdivision in Howrah district in the Indian state of West Bengal.

== Geography ==
Khantora is located at 22°37′13″N 88°12′33″E

== Demographics ==
As per 2011 Census of India Khantora had a total population of 6,547 of which 3,331 (51%) were males and 3,216 (49%) were females. Population below 6 years was 545. The total number of literates in Khantora was 5,362 (89.34% of the population over 6 years).

Khantora was part of Kolkata Urban Agglomeration in 2011 census.

As of 2001 India census, Khantora had a population of 5,773. Males constitute 50% of the population and females 50%. Khantora has an average literacy rate of 77%, higher than the national average of 59.5%: male literacy is 82% and female literacy is 72%. In Khantora, 9% of the population is under 6 years of age.

== Transport ==
Domjur Road railway station on Howrah-Amta line is the nearest railway station.
