= Kesabpur, India =

Kesabpur
- Census Town
- Location in West Bengal, India Kesabpur (India)
- Coordinates: 22.619597°N 88.207469°E
- Country: India
- State: West Bengal
- District: Howrah

Population (2011)
  - Total: 12,073

Languages
  - Official: Bengali, English
- Time zone: UTC+5:30 (IST)
- Vehicle registration: WB
- Lok Sabha constituency: Sreerampur
- Vidhan Sabha constituency: Domjur
- Website: howrah.gov.in

Kesabpur is a census town in Domjur CD Block of Howrah Sadar subdivision in Howrah district in the Indian state of West Bengal.

== Demographics ==
As per 2011 Census of India Kesabpur had a total population of 12,073 of which 6,130 (51%) were males and 5,953 (49%) were females. Population below 6 years was 1,369. The total number of literates in Kesabpur was 8,623 (80.56% of the population over 6 years).

As of 2001 India census, Kesabpur had a population of 10,356. Males constitute 51% of the population and females 49%. Kesabpur has an average literacy rate of 66%, higher than the national average of 59.5%: male literacy is 71% and female literacy is 61%. In Kesabpur, 13% of the population is under 6 years of age.

== Transport ==
Domjur Road railway station and Sankrail railway station are the nearest railway stations.
