= Gulsan Mullick =

Indian politician

Gulsan Mullick (born 1958) is an Indian politician from West Bengal. He is a member of the West Bengal Legislative Assembly from Panchla Assembly constituency in Howrah district. He won the 2021 West Bengal Legislative Assembly election representing the All India Trinamool Congress party.

== Early life and education ==
Mullick is from Panchla, Howrah district, West Bengal. He is the son of late Yunus Mullick. He studied Class 12 at Prabhu Jagabandhu College, Andul, Howrah, which is affiliated with the University of Calcutta and passed the pre university course examinations in 1977.

== Career ==
Mullick won from Panchla Assembly constituency representing the All India Trinamool Congress in the 2021 West Bengal Legislative Assembly election. He polled 104,572 votes and defeated his nearest rival, Mohit Lal Ghanti of the Bharatiya Janata Party, by a margin of 32,751 votes. He first became an MLA winning the 1996 West Bengal Legislative Assembly election representing the Indian National Congress. He later shifted to the All India Trinamool Congress party and won three consecutive terms in 2011, 2016 and 2021. In 2016 Assembly election, he defeated Doli Roy of AIFB by a margin of 31,927 votes.
