= Gabberia =

- Census Town
- Location in West Bengal, India Gabberia (India)
- Coordinates: 22.55°N 88.13°E
- Country: India
- State: West Bengal
- District: Howrah

Population (2011)
  - Total: 5,823

Languages
  - Official: Bengali, English
- Time zone: UTC+5:30 (IST)
- Vehicle registration: WB
- Lok Sabha constituency: Howrah
- Vidhan Sabha constituency: Panchla
- Website: howrah.gov.in

Gabberia is a census town in Panchla CD Block of Howrah Sadar subdivision in Howrah district in the state of West Bengal, India.

== Geography ==
Gabberia is located at 22.55°N 88.13°E.

== Demographics ==
As per 2011 Census of India Gabberia had a total population of 5,823 of which 2,988 (51%) were males and 2,835 (49%) were females. Population below 6 years was 775. The total number of literates in Gabberia was 4,110 (81.42% of the population over 6 years).

As of 2001 India census, Gabberia had a population of 4974. Males constitute 51% of the population and females 49%. Gabberia has an average literacy rate of 64%, higher than the national average of 59.5%: male literacy is 70%, and female literacy is 57%. In Gabberia, 16% of the population is under 6 years of age.
