= Beldubi =

- Census Town
- Location in West Bengal, India Beldubi (India)
- Coordinates: 22.54°N 88.17°E
- Country: India
- State: West Bengal
- District: Howrah

Population (2011)
  - Total: 10,871

Languages
  - Official: Bengali, English
- Time zone: UTC+5:30 (IST)
- Vehicle registration: WB
- Lok Sabha constituency: Howrah
- Vidhan Sabha constituency: Panchla
- Website: howrah.gov.in

Beldubi is a census town in Panchla CD Block of Howrah Sadar subdivision in Howrah district in the state of West Bengal, India.

== Geography ==
Beldubi is located at 22°32′26″N 88°10′22″E

== Demographics ==
As per 2011 Census of India Beldubi had a total population of 10,871 of which 5,568 (51%) were males and 5,303 (49%) were females. Population below 6 years was 1,360. The total number of literates in Beldubi was 7,650 (80.43% of the population over 6 years).

As of 2001 India census, Beldubi had a population of 8983. Males constitute 50% of the population and females 50%. Beldubi has an average literacy rate of 62%, higher than the national average of 59.5%; with 56% of the males and 44% of females literate. 14% of the population is under 6 years of age.
