= Jala Kendua =

- Census Town
- Location in West Bengal, India Jala Kendua (India)
- Coordinates: 22.55°N 88.18°E
- Country: India
- State: West Bengal
- District: Howrah

Population (2011)
  - Total: 6,658

Languages
  - Official: Bengali, English
- Time zone: UTC+5:30 (IST)
- Vehicle registration: WB
- Lok Sabha constituency: Howrah
- Vidhan Sabha constituency: Panchla
- Website: howrah.gov.in

Jala Kendua is a census town in Panchla CD Block of Howrah Sadar subdivision in Howrah district in the Indian state of West Bengal.

== Geography ==
Jala Kendua is located at 22.55°N 88.18°E.

== Demographics ==
As per 2011 Census of India Jala Kendua had a total population of 6,658 of which 3,375 (51%) were males and 3,283 (49%) were females. Population below 6 years was 1,029. The total number of literates in Jala Kendua was 4,290 (76.21% of the population over 6 years).

As of 2001 India census, Jala Kendua had a population of 5,783. Males constitute 49% of the population and females 51%. Jala Kendua has an average literacy rate of 50%, lower than the national average of 59.5%: male literacy is 56%, and female literacy is 44%. In Jala Kendua, 18% of the population is under 6 years of age.
