= Bikihakola =

- Census Town
- Location in West Bengal, India Bikihakola (India)
- Coordinates: 22.55°N 88.15°E
- Country: India
- State: West Bengal
- District: Howrah

Population (2011)
  - Total: 14,540

Languages
  - Official: Bengali, English
- Time zone: UTC+5:30 (IST)
- PIN: 711322
- Vehicle registration: WB
- Lok Sabha constituency: Howrah
- Vidhan Sabha constituency: Panchla
- Website: howrah.gov.in

Bikihakola is a census town in Panchla CD Block of Howrah Sadar subdivision in Howrah district in the state of West Bengal, India.

== Geography ==
Bikihakola is located at 22°33′28″N 88°09′00″E

== Demographics ==
As per 2011 Census of India Bikihakola had a total population of 14,540 of which 7,517 (52%) were males and 7,023 (48%) were females. Population below 6 years was 1,749. The total number of literates in Bikihakola was 10,557 (82.53% of the population over 6 years).

As of 2001 India census, Bikihakola had a population of 11,901. Males constitute 52% of the population and females 48%. Bikihakola has an average literacy rate of 66%, higher than the national average of 59.5%; with male literacy of 72% and female literacy of 59%. 14% of the population is under 6 years of age.
