= Paniara =

- Census Town
- Location in West Bengal, India Paniara (India)
- Coordinates: 22.55134°N 88.16439°E
- Country: India
- State: West Bengal
- District: Howrah

Population (2011)
  - Total: 7,787

Languages
  - Official: Bengali, English
- Time zone: UTC+5:30 (IST)
- Vehicle registration: WB
- Lok Sabha constituency: Howrah
- Vidhan Sabha constituency: Panchla
- Website: howrah.gov.in

Paniara is a census town in Panchla CD Block of Howrah Sadar subdivision in Howrah district in the Indian state of West Bengal.

== Geography ==
Paniara is located at 22°33′05″N 88°09′52″E

== Demographics ==
As per 2011 Census of India Paniara had a total population of 7,787 of which 3,961 (51%) were males and 3,826 (49%) were females. Population below 6 years was 984. The total number of literates in Paniara was 5,463 (80.30% of the population over 6 years).

As of 2001 India census, Paniara had a population of 6708. Males constitute 51% of the population and females 49%. Paniara has an average literacy rate of 62%, higher than the national average of 59.5%: male literacy is 68%, and female literacy is 56%. In Paniara, 15% of the population is under 6 years of age.

== Transport ==
Paniara is located on NH 6.
