= Ankurhati =

- Census Town
- Location in West Bengal, India Ankurhati (India)
- Coordinates: 22.60°N 88.24°E
- Country: India
- State: West Bengal
- District: Howrah

Population (2011)
  - Total: 11,130

Languages
  - Official: Bengali, English
- Time zone: UTC+5:30 (IST)
- Vehicle registration: WB
- Lok Sabha constituency: Sreerampur
- Vidhan Sabha constituency: Domjur
- Website: howrah.gov.in

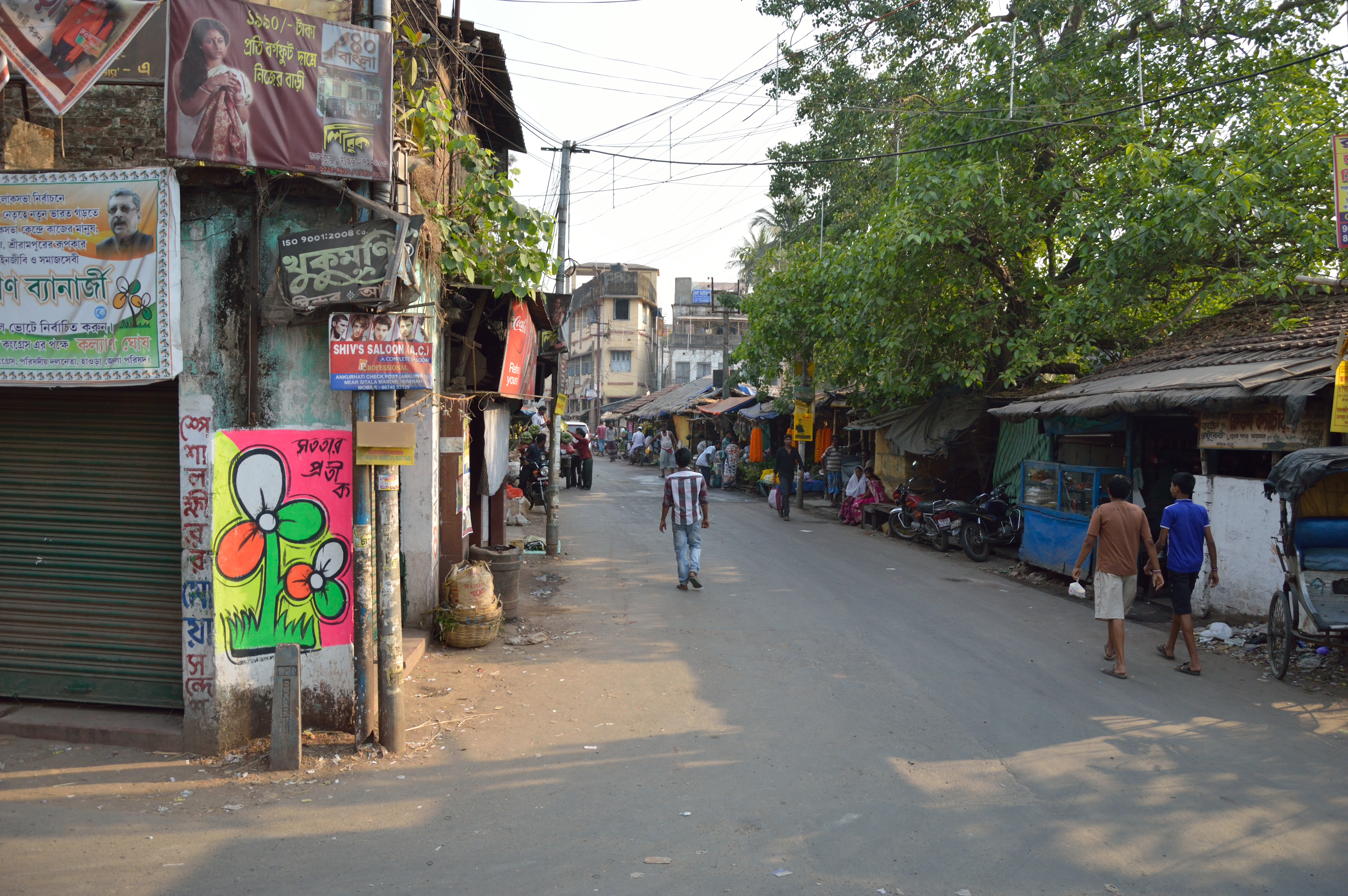
Ankurhati-Makardaha Road, Domjur, Howrah

Ankurhati is a census town in Domjur CD Block of Howrah Sadar subdivision in Howrah district in the Indian state of West Bengal.

== Geography ==
Ankurhati is located at 22°36′24″N 88°14′29″E.

== Demographics ==
As per 2011 Census of India Ankurhati had a total population of 11,130 of which 5,750 (52%) were males and 5,380 (48%) were females. Population below 6 years was 1,401. The total number of literates in Ankurhati was 8,136 (83.63% of the population over 6 years).

Ankurhati was part of Kolkata Urban Agglomeration in 2011 census.

As of 2001 India census, Ankurhati had a population of 7787. Males constitute 53% of the population and females 47%. Ankurhati has an average literacy rate of 71%, higher than the national average of 59.5%; with 56% of the males and 44% of females literate. 13% of the population is under 6 years of age.

== Transport ==
Ankurhati is the junction of National Highway 16 (part of Asian Highway 45) and Makardaha-Mahiari Road. People can easily go to several areas of Kolkata, Howrah and Hooghly from here.

=== Bus ===
==== Private Bus ====
- 40 Birshibpur - Serampore
- 79 Panchla - Dunlop
- E43 Dihibhursut - Howrah Station
- E53 Narit - Howrah Station
- L3 Jhikhira/Muchighata - Howrah Station

==== CTC Bus ====
- E6 Amta - Esplanade
- E7 Bagnan railway station - Esplanade

Many Shuttle Buses (Without Numbers) also pass through Ankurhati.

=== Train ===
Santragachi Junction is the nearest railway station.
