= Khalia =

- Census Town
- Location in West Bengal, India Khalia (West Bengal) Khalia (India)
- Coordinates: 22.6181°N 88.29261°E
- Country: India
- State: West Bengal
- District: Howrah

Population (2011)
  - Total: 6,265

Languages
  - Official: Bengali, English
- Time zone: UTC+5:30 (IST)
- Vehicle registration: WB
- Lok Sabha constituency: Sreerampur
- Vidhan Sabha constituency: Domjur
- Website: howrah.gov.in

Khalia is a census town in Bally Jagachha CD Block of Howrah Sadar subdivision in Howrah district in the Indian state of West Bengal. Khalia is under the jurisdiction of Liluah Police Station of Howrah City Police.

== Geography ==
Khalia is located at 22°37′05″N 88°17′33″E.

== Demographics ==
As per 2011 Census of India Khalia had a total population of 6,265 of which 3,165 (51%) were males and 3,100 (49%) were females. Population below 6 years was 631. The total number of literates in Khalia was 4,696 (83.35% of the population over 6 years).

As of 2001 India census, Khalia had a population of 4,957. Males constitute 52% of the population and females 48%. Khalia has an average literacy rate of 69%, higher than the national average of 59.5%: male literacy is 74% and female literacy is 62%. In Khalia, 11% of the population is under 6 years of age.

== Transport ==
Khalia has the junction of Benaras Road and National Highway 16 (part of Asian Highway 45). People can go to several places of Kolkata, Howrah and Hooghly from here.

=== Bus ===
==== Private Bus ====
- 40 Birshibpur - Serampore
- 57 Kona - Howrah Station/Esplanade
- 57A Chanditala - Howrah Station
- 79 Panchla - Dunlop

==== Mini Bus ====
- 18 Kona - Esplanade
- 30 Baluhati - Esplanade

Many Shuttle Buses (Without Numbers) also pass through Khalia along National Highway 16.

=== Train ===
Kona railway station on Howrah-Amta line is the nearest railway station.
