= Panchla (community development block) =

- Community development block

- Location within West Bengal
- Coordinates: 22°32′N 88°08′E
- Country: India
- State: West Bengal
- District: Howrah
- Parliamentary constituency: Howrah
- Assembly constituency: Panchla

Area
  - Total: 20.63 sq mi (53.42 km^{2})
- Elevation: 23 ft (7 m)

Population (2011)
  - Total: 251,930
  - Density: 12,210/sq mi (4,716/km^{2})
- Time zone: UTC+5.30 (IST)
- PIN: 711322 (Panchla)
- Area code: 03214
- Vehicle registration: WB-11, WB-12, WB-13, WB-14
- Literacy Rate: 78.98 per cent
- Website: http://howrah.gov.in/

Panchla is a community development block that forms an administrative division in Howrah Sadar subdivision of Howrah district in the Indian state of West Bengal.

== Geography ==
Map of Howrah District

=== Location ===
Panchla is located at 22°32′N 88°08′E.

Panchla CD Block is bounded by Jagatballavpur CD Block in the north and west, Domjur and Sankrail CD Blocks in the east and Uluberia I and Uluberia II CD Blocks in the south.

It is located 10 km from Howrah, the district headquarters.

=== Area and administration ===
Panchla CD Block has an area of 53.42 km^{2}. Panchla Police Station serves this CD Block. Panchla panchayat samity has 11 gram panchayats. The block has 26 inhabited villages. Headquarters of this block is at Bikihakola.

=== Topography ===
Howrah district is located on the west bank of the Hooghly. The Rupnarayan flows on the west and south of the district and the Damodar intersects it. The district consists of a flat alluvial plain.

=== Gram panchayats ===
Gram panchayats of Panchla block/panchayat samiti are: Banharishpur, Beldubi, Bikihakola, Chara–Panchla, Deulpur, Gangadharpur, Jalabiswanathpur, Jujarsaha, Panchla, Sahapur and Suvarara.

== Demographics ==
=== Overview ===
Rural population is 49.63% of the total population of Howrah district as per 2001 census. Scheduled castes account for 15.41% of the population, scheduled tribes 0.44% and Muslims 24.4% of the population. As the economy is prevalently industrial, majority of the population depends on industries for a living. Only 30% of the population is engaged in cultivation.

BPL families in CD Blocks
of Howrah district
Howrah Sadar subdivision
Bally Jagachha – 4.35%
Domjur – 7.21%
Panchla – 1.82%
Sankrail – 5.67%
Jagatballavpur – 10.35%
Uluberia subdivision
Uluberia I – 23.38%
Uluberia II – 19.76%
Amta I – 16.07%
Amta II – 16.38%
Udaynarayanpur – 14.12%
Bagnan I – 18.87%
Bagnan II – 21.18%
Shyampur I – 36.51%
Shyampur II – 17.85%
Source: Rural Household
Survey 2005

=== Population ===
As per 2011 Census of India Panchla CD Block had a total population of 251,930, of which 43,087 were rural and 208,843 were urban. There were 129,160 (51%) males and 122,770 (49%) females. Population below 6 years was 32,043. Scheduled Castes numbered 44,475 and Scheduled Tribes numbered 75.

As per 2001 census, Panchla block had a total population of 213,893, out of which 109,229 were males and 104,664 were females. Panchla block registered a population growth of 15.92 per cent during the 1991-2001 decade. Decadal growth for Howrah district was 12.76 per cent. Scheduled castes at 45,946 formed around one-fourth the population. Scheduled tribes numbered 1,093. Decadal growth in West Bengal was 17.84 per cent.

=== Census Towns and large villages ===
Census Towns in Panchla CD Block (2011 census figures in brackets): Kuldanga (7,742), Gondalpara (4,474), Khasjalalsi (5,111), Deulpur (12,618), Kusadanga (5,434), Gangadharpur (7,533), Jujarsaha (21,820), Shuvararah (14,330), Mallikbagan (8,869), Jaynagar (6,977), Jala Kendua (6,658), Beldubi (10,871), Paniara (7,787), Bikihakola (14,540), Gabberia (5,823), Dhunki (9,784), Ban Harishpur (16,064), Paschim Panchla (6,951), Panchla (26,432) and Sahapur (9,022).

Large villages in Panchla CD Block (2011 census figures in brackets): Jala Bishwanathpur (8,569), Ranihati (4,662) and Sankhali (4,290).

=== Literacy ===
As per 2011 census the total number of literates in Panchla CD Block was 173,656 (78.98% of the population over 6 years) out of which 93,494 (54%) were males and 80,162 (46%) were females.

As per 2011 census, literacy in Howrah district was 78.66%. Literacy in West Bengal was 77.08% in 2011. Literacy in India in 2011 was 74.04%.

As per 2001 census, Panchla block had a total literacy of 71.42 per cent for the 6+ age group. While male literacy was 78.55 per cent female literacy was 63.95 per cent. Howrah district had a total literacy of 77.01 per cent, male literacy being 83.22 per cent and female literacy being 70.11 per cent.

Literacy in CD blocks of
Howrah district
Howrah Sadar subdivision
Bally Jagachha – 87.75%
Domjur – 81.33%
Panchla – 78.98%
Sankrail – 83.11%
Jagatballavpur – 79.22%
Uluberia subdivision
Uluberia I – 77.39%
Uluberia II – 78.05%
Amta I – 81.26%
Amta II – 81.47%
Udaynarayanpur – 81.05%
Bagnan I – 84.09%
Bagnan II – 82.57%
Shyampur I – 78.96%
Shyampur II – 80.49%
Source: 2011 Census: CD Block Wise
Primary Census Abstract Data

=== Religion and language ===
Religion in Panchla CD block (2011)
Hinduism	53.21%
Islam	46.62%
Other or not stated	0.17%

In 2011 census Hindus numbered 134,061 and formed 53.21% of the population in Panchla CD Block. Muslims numbered 117,444 and formed 46.62% of the population. Others numbered 425 and formed 0.17% of the population.

In 2011, Hindus numbered 3,535,844 and formed 72.90% of the population in Howrah district. Muslims numbered 1,270,641 and formed 26.20% of the population. In West Bengal Hindus numbered 64,385,546 and formed 70.53% of the population. Muslims numbered 24,654,825 and formed 27.01% of the population.

Bengali is the predominant language, spoken by 99.54% of the population.

== Economy ==
=== Infrastructure ===
Prior to 2003–04, Panchla CD Block had 68 hectares of vested land, out of which 49 hectares were distributed amongst 1,331 persons. In Panchla CD Block more than one crop was grown in 2,588 hectares. Net area sown in the block was 5,035 hectares. Panchla had 1,825 hectares of canals for irrigation. In Panchla CD Block 26 mouzas were electrified up to March 2004.

== Education ==
In 2003–04, Panchla CD Block had 99 primary schools with 18,923 students, 4 middle schools with 1,396 students, 11 high schools with 9,111 students and 7 higher secondary schools with 8,593 students. Panchla CD Block had 1 general college with 778 students. Panchla CD Block had 233 institutions with 29,175 students for special and non-formal education. It had 2 mass literacy centres.

== Healthcare ==
Panchla CD Block had 3 health centres, 6 clinics, 2 dispensaries and 1 hospital with 142 beds and 21 doctors in 2003. It had 30 family welfare centres.
