= Jangipara (community development block) =

- Community development block
- Coordinates: 22.7405560°N 88.0538890°E
- Country: India
- State: West Bengal
- District: Hooghly

Government
  - Type: Representative democracy

Area
  - Total: 164.23 km^{2} (63.41 sq mi)
- Elevation: 14 m (46 ft)

Population (2011)
  - Total: 221,578
  - Density: 1,349.2/km^{2} (3,494.4/sq mi)

Languages
  - Official: Bengali, English
- Time zone: UTC+5:30 (IST)
- PIN: 712404 (Jangipara); 712408 (Rajbalhat); 712424 (Antpur)
- Telephone/STD code: 03212
- Vehicle registration: WB 15, WB 16, WB 18
- Literacy: 79.62%
- Lok Sabha constituency: Sreerampur
- Vidhan Sabha constituency: Jangipara
- Website: hooghly.gov.in

Jangipara is a community development block that forms an administrative division in Srirampore subdivision of Hooghly district in the Indian state of West Bengal.

== Overview ==
The Jangipara CD Block is part of the Hooghly-Damodar Plain, one of the three natural regions in the district of the flat alluvial plains, that forms part of the Gangetic Delta. The region has many depressions which receive water from the surrounding lands during the rainy season and discharge the water through small channels.

== History ==
=== Bhurishrestha Empire ===
Rajbalhat in Jangipara CD Block was capital of Bhurshut kingdom or Bhurishrestha Empire in the 16th century. There used to be a garh (fort) but no signs of it survive. Only one temple, that of Rajballavi, of that era is still active. There were three garhs and forts at Garh Bhabanipur, Pandua (Pedo or Pedo Basantapur) and Rajbalhat, but there is hardly any trace of these.

=== Furfura Sharif ===
Furfura Sharif in Jangipur CD Block is a Muslim pilgrimage centre. A mosque built by Muqlish Khan in 1375, still stands there. A Sufi settlement was established there during Akbar’s rule.

== Geography ==
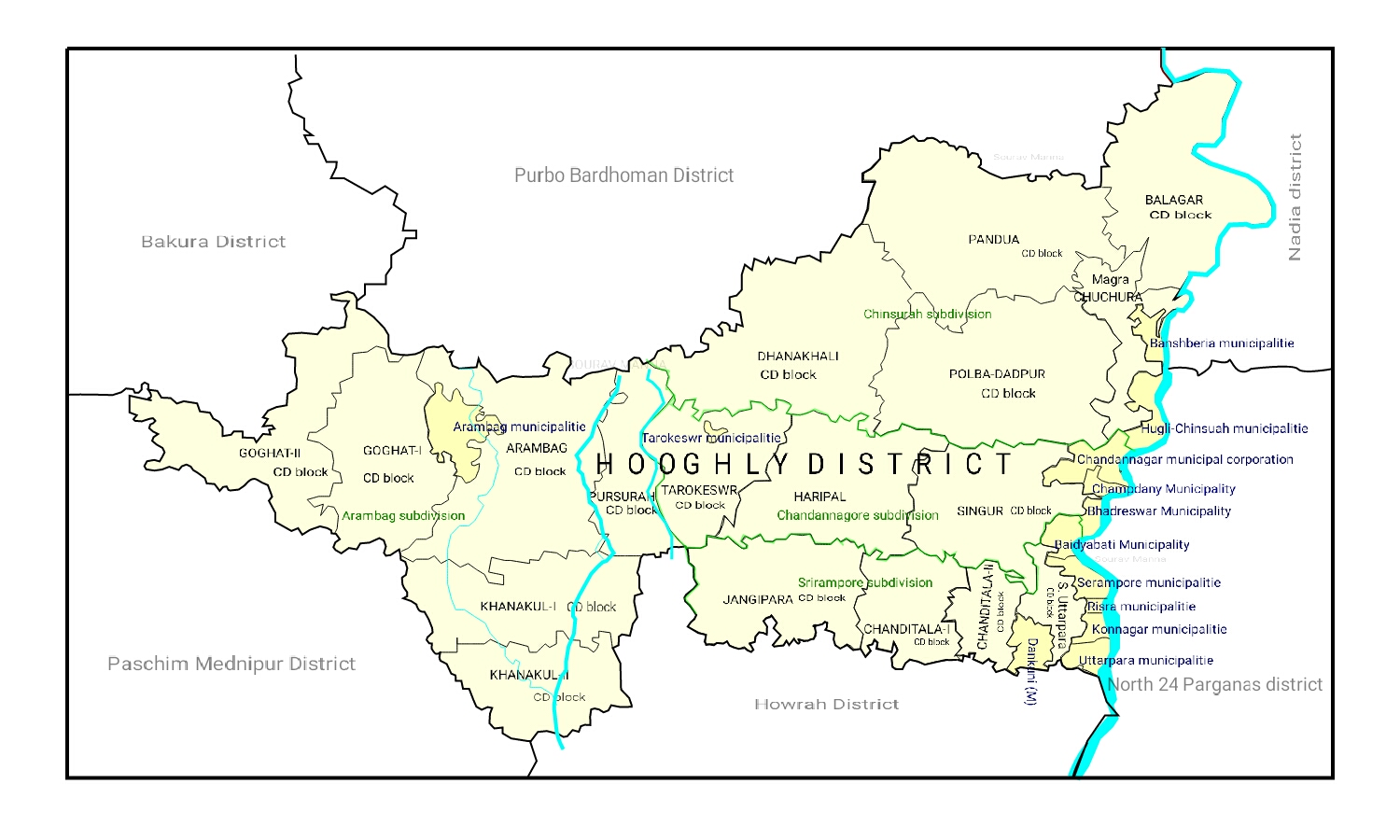
Map of Hooghly district showing CD blocks and municipal areas

Jangipara is located at 22°44′26″N 88°03′14″E.

Jangipara CD Block is bounded by Tarakeswar and Haripal CD Blocks in the north, Chanditala I CD Block in the east, Jagatballavpur CD Block, in Howrah district, in the south and Udaynarayanpur CD Block in Howrah district and Pursurah CD Block in the west. It is located 45 km from Chinsurah, the district headquarters.

Jangipara CD Block has an area of 164.23 km^{2}. It has 1 panchayat samity, 10 gram panchayats, 177 gram sansads (village councils), 129 mouzas and 128 inhabited villages. Jangipara police station serves this block. Headquarters of this CD Block is at Jangipara.

Jangipara CD block map

Gram panchayats of Jangipara block/ panchayat samiti are: Antpur, Dilakash, Furfurah, Jangipara, Kotalpur, Mundalika, Radhanagar, Rajbalhat I, Rajbalhat II and Rashidpur.

== Demographics ==
=== Population ===
As per the 2011 Census of India, Jangipara CD Block had a total population of 221,578, of which 205,099 were rural and 16,479 were urban. There were 112,317 (51%) males and 109,261 (49%) females. Population below 6 years was 11,858. Scheduled Castes numbered 68,395 (30.87%) and Scheduled Tribes numbered 10,220 (4.61%).

As per the 2001 census, Jangipara block had a total population of 200,936, out of which 101,338 were males and 99,598 were females. Jangipara block registered a population growth of 13.28 per cent during the 1991-2001 decade. Decadal growth for Hooghly district was 15.72 per cent. Decadal growth in West Bengal was 17.84 per cent.

The only Census Town in Jangipara CD Block is (2011 census figure in brackets): Rajbalhat (16,479).

Large villages (with 4,000+ population) in Jangipara CD Block are (2011 census figures in brackets): Borhal (4,548), Krishnanagar (10,520), Kotalpur (6,948), Furfura (7,407), Mandalika (5,946) and Laksmanpur (4,008).

Other villages in Jangipara CD Block include (2011 census figures in brackets): Antpur (2,623), Jangipara (2,700).

=== Literacy ===
As per the 2011 census the total number of literates in Jangipara CD Block was 157,993 (79.62% of the population over 6 years) out of which males numbered 85,861 (85.47% of the male population over 6 years) and females numbered 72,132 (73.63% of the female population over 6 years). The gender disparity (the difference between female and male literacy rates) was 11.84%.

As of 2001 census, Jangipara block had a total literacy of 50.82%. While male literacy was 71.82 per cent, female literacy was 48.83%.

See also – List of West Bengal districts ranked by literacy rate

Literacy in CD blocks of
Hooghly district
Arambagh subdivision
Arambagh – 79.10
Khanakul I – 77.73
Khanakul II – 79.16
Goghat I – 78.70
Goghat II – 77.24
Pursurah – 82.12
Chandannagar subdivision
Haripal – 78.59
Singur – 84.01
Tarakeswar – 79.96
Chinsurah subdivision
Balagarh – 76.94
Chinsurah Mogra – 83.01
Dhaniakhali – 75.66
Pandua – 75.86
Polba Dadpur – 75.14
Srirampore subdivision
Chanditala I – 83.76
Chanditala II – 84.78
Jangipara – 75.34
Sreerampur Uttarpara – 87.33
Source: 2011 Census: CD Block Wise
Primary Census Abstract Data

=== Language and religion ===
Religion in Jangipara CD block (2011)
Hinduism	76.41%
Islam	23.15%
Other or not stated	0.44%

As per the 2011 census, majority of the population of the district belong to the Hindu community with a population share of 82.9% followed by Muslims at 15.8%. The percentage of the Hindu population of the district has followed a decreasing trend from 87.1% in 1961 to 82.9% in the latest census 2011. On the other hand, the percentage of Muslim population has increased from 12.7% in 1961 to 15.8% in 2011 census.

In 2011 census Hindus numbered 169,308 and formed 76.41% of the population in Jangipara CD Block. Muslims numbered 51,295 and formed 23.15% of the population. Others numbered 975 and formed 0.44% of the population.

Languages of Jangipara CD block (2011)
1. Bengali (97.1%)
2. Santali (2.59%)
3. Others (0.29%)

At the time of the 2011 census, 97.12% of the population spoke Bengali, 2.59% Santali and 1.20% Hindi as their first language.

== Rural poverty ==
As per poverty estimates obtained from household survey for families living below poverty line in 2005, rural poverty in Jangipara CD Block was 32.05%.

== Economy ==
=== Livelihood ===
Livelihood
in Jangipara CD Block
1. Cultivators (14.1%)
2. Agricultural labourers (34.8%)
3. Household industries (14.9%)
4. Other Workers (36.2%)

In Jangipara CD Block in 2011, amongst the class of total workers, cultivators formed 14.13%, agricultural labourers 34.77%, household industry workers 14.86% and other workers 36.24%.

=== Infrastructure ===
There are 128 inhabited villages in Jangipara CD Block. 100% villages have power supply. 82 villages have more than one source of drinking water (tap, well, tube well, hand pump), 2 villages have only tube well/ borewell and 43 villages have only hand pump. 9 Villages have post offices, 12 villages have sub post offices and 3 villages have post and telegraph offices. 114 villages have landlines, 70 villages have public call offices and 113 villages have mobile phone coverage. 44 villages have pucca roads and 43 villages have bus service (public/ private). 19 villages have agricultural credit societies, 14 villages have commercial/ co-operative banks and 1 village has bank ATM.

=== Weaving ===
Rajbalhat is an important weaving centre, producing saris and dhoties.

=== Agriculture ===
This is a rich agricultural area with several cold storages. Though rice is the prime crop of the district, the agricultural economy largely depends on potato, jute, vegetables, and orchard products. Potato is cultivated in all the blocks of this district Jangipara CD Block produced the highest quantity of potatoes amongst all the CD Blocks in 2103-14.

Some of the primary and other hats or markets in the Jangipur block area are: Antpur, Jangipar hat, Kulakash hat, Satghara hat, Sitapur hat, Taltala cattle hat, Kalarkash bazar and Rahtdpur.

Important Handicrafts of Hooghly District
- Zari Work on Sari - Pandua, Pursurah, Jangipara, Tarakeswar and other blocks - 3,000 families involved
- Chikon Embroidery – Babnan, Pandua, Singur - 2,500 families involved
- Silk and Cotton Printing – Serampore (Chanditala) - 300 families involved
- Brass and Bell Metal – Manikpat, Goghat, Arambagh - 150 families involved
- Conch Shell – Pandua, Khanakul, Makla, Chandannagar
- Jute Diversified Product – Baidyabati, Mogra
- Terracota – Chinsurah, Chandannagar, Baidyabati, Mogra

Source:District Human Development Report 2010: Hooghly P. 67

The Tebhaga movement launched in 1946, in 24 Parganas district, aimed at securing for the share-croppers a better position within the existing land relation structure. Although the subsequent Bargadari Act of 1950 recognised the rights of bargadars to a higher share of crops from the land that they tilled, it was not implemented fully. Large tracts, beyond the prescribed limit of land ceiling, remained with the rich landlords. From 1977 onwards major land reforms took place in West Bengal. Land in excess of land ceiling was acquired and distributed amongst the peasants. Following land reforms land ownership pattern has undergone transformation. In 2013-14, persons engaged in agriculture in Jangipara CD Block could be classified as follows: bargadars 14.89%, patta (document) holders 6.19%, small farmers (possessing land between 1 and 2 hectares) 3.00%, marginal farmers (possessing land up to 1 hectare) 25.48% and agricultural labourers 50.44%.

Jangipara CD Block had 107 fertiliser depots, 52 seed stores and 53 fair price shops in 2013-14.

In 2013-14, Jangipara CD Block produced 94,861 tonnes of Aman paddy, the main winter crop from 32,638 hectares, 14,528 tonnes of Boro paddy (spring crop) from 4,601 hectares, 30,806 tonnes of jute from 1,347 hectares, 342,597 tonnes of potatoes from 11,830 hectares. It also produced oilseeds .

In 2013-14, the total area irrigated in Jangipara CD Block was 17,068 hectares, out of which 8,940 hectares were irrigated by canal water, 3,360 hectares by tank water, 330 hectares by river lift irrigation, 670 hectares by deep tube wells and 3,768 hectares by shallow tube wells.

=== Banking ===
In 2013-14, Jangipara CD Block had offices of 13 commercial banks and 2 gramin banks.

== Transport ==
Jangipara CD Block has 3 ferry services and 4 originating/ terminating bus routes. The nearest railway station is 17 km from CD Block headquarters.

The narrow gauge line of Martin's Light Railways from Howrah Maidan to Amta, Sehakhala and Champadanga was built in 1897 and was closed down in 1971. While the broad gauge Howrah-Amta line came up in 2000, and although the branch line from Bargachia to Sehakhala and Champadanga was sanctioned along with the Howrah-Amta line in 1974-75, the branch line is yet to come up. The project has suffered because on non-acquisition of land by the state government.

Now, one has to go to Jangipara by road either directly from Kolkata or from Tarakeswar or Haripal. From Kolkata the road route is via Howrah-Domjur-Bargachhia-Amta, approx 47 km. Or one has to avail a local train from Howrah, Tarekeswar / Arambag local, to Haripal, from Haripal bus is available for Jangipara.

== Education ==
In 2013-14, Jangipara CD Block had 146 primary schools with 14,282 students, 11 middle schools with 1,252 students, 10 high schools with 7,144 students and 16 higher secondary schools with 17,313 students. Jangipara CD Block had 1 general college with 661 students, 263 institutions for special and non-formal education with 7,596 students

Mahitosh Nandy Mahavidyalaya, a general degree college, was established at Jangipara, in 2007.

Jangipara assembly constituency covers a primarily rural area. It is around 45 kilometres (28 mi) from Kolkata and has 170,000 voters. Forty per cent of them are in the 18-30 age group. It has over a hundred primary, twenty-six secondary and eight higher secondary schools, and one degree college in Jangipara. However, hundreds of students from Jangipara travel over 15 km to Haripal or Howrah to attend college for their special subject.

In Jangipara CD Block, amongst the 128 inhabited villages, 10 villages had no school, 46 villages had more than 1 primary school, 82 villages had at least 1 primary school, 36 villages had at least 1 primary and 1 middle school and 25 villages had at least 1 middle and 1 secondary school.

== Culture ==
Jangipra CD block is home to some religious/ cultural centres.

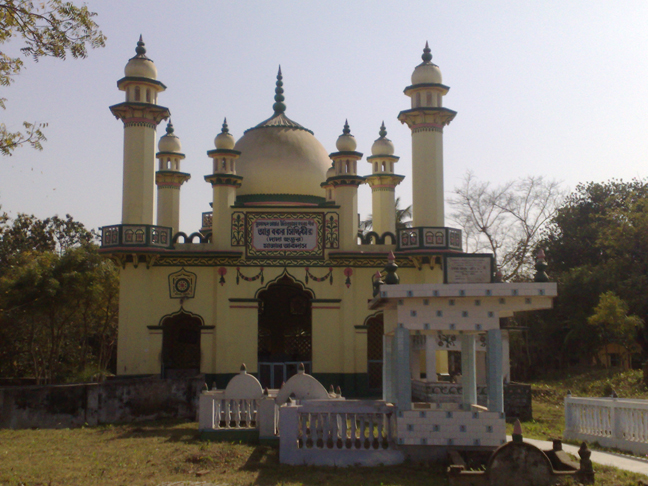
Furfura Sharif: The mosque built by Muqlish Khan in 1375 (in picture) is a site for Muslim pilgrimage, especially during the Pir’s Mela.

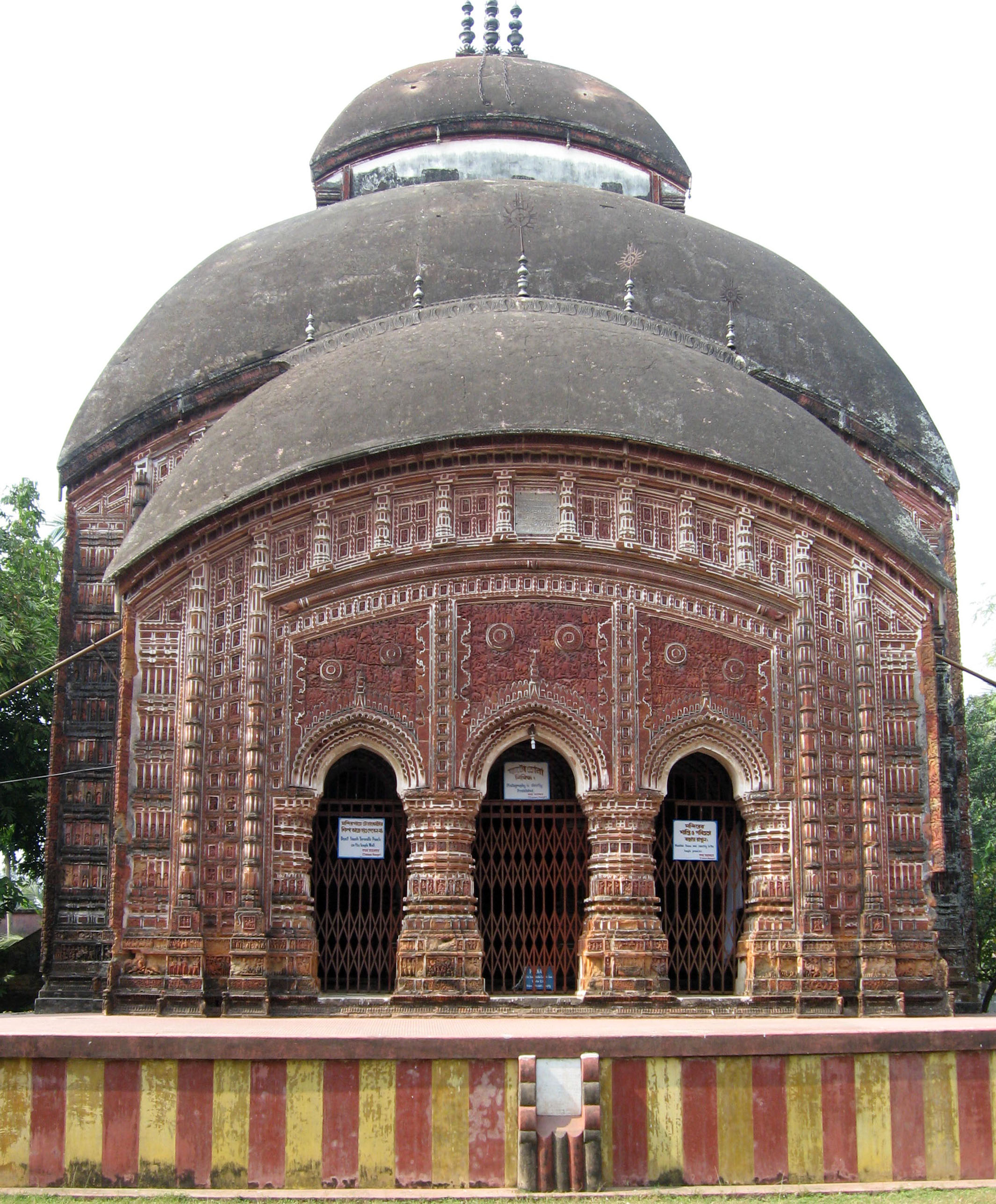
Antpur is home to one of the finest pieces of terracotta architecture. The Radha Govindjiu temple (in picture) was built in 1785.

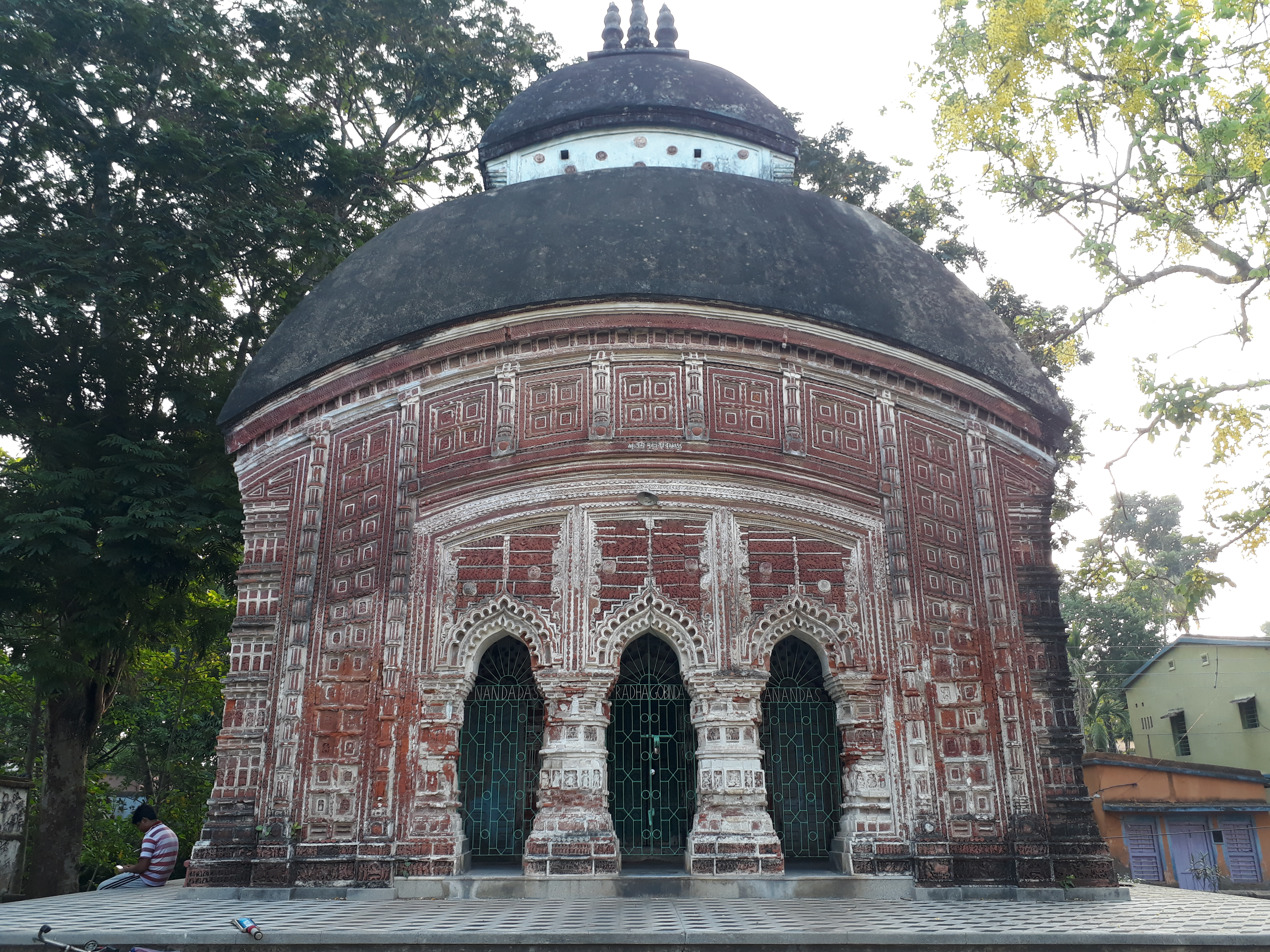
Rajbalhat: The Radhakantajiu (in picture) and other temples are there. Durga is worshipped in Jangipara and Rajbalhat as Rajballavi. She is a mixed form of Durga, Kali and Saraswati. It is famous for handloom saris.

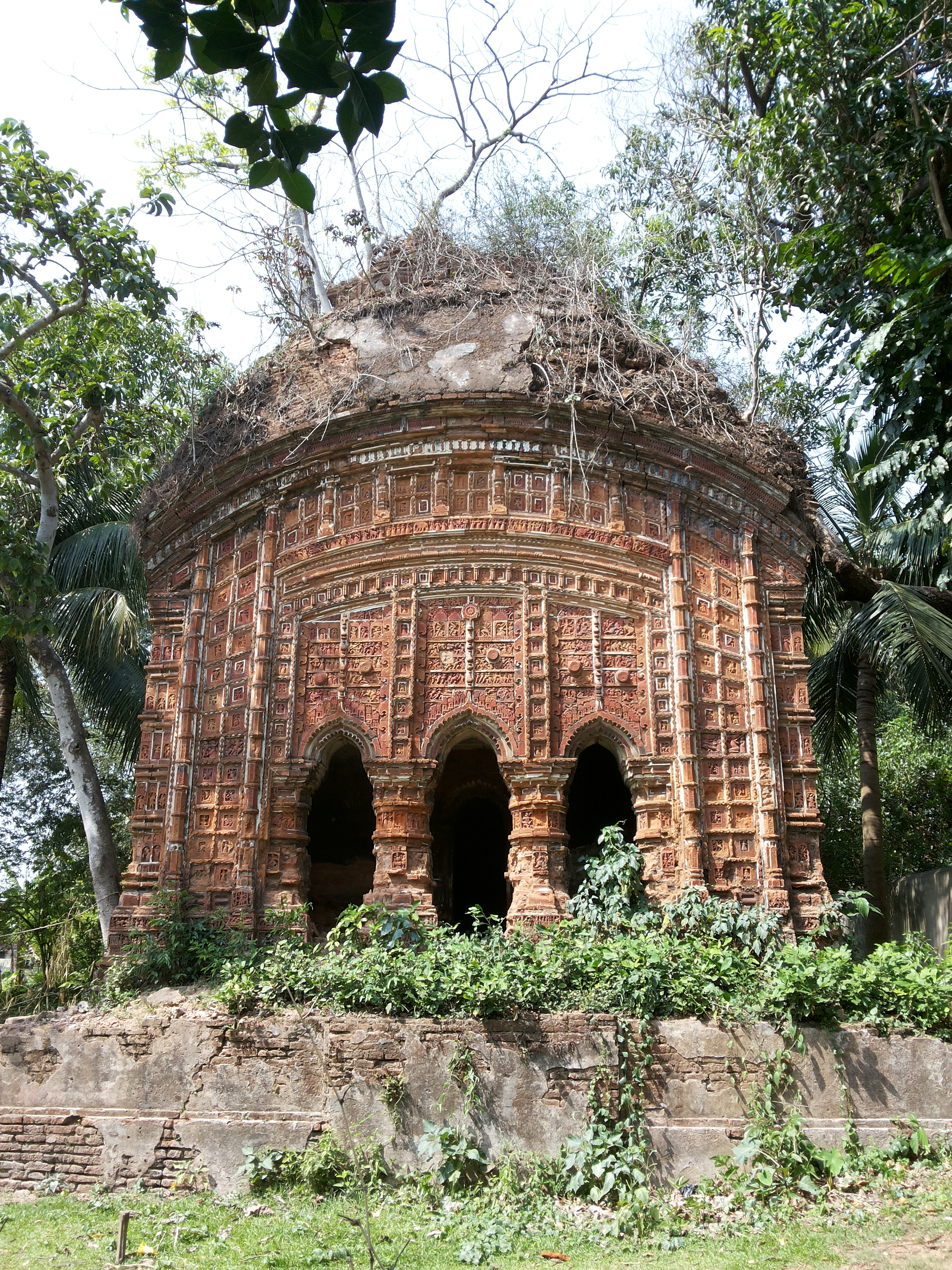
Kotalpur: The Rajrajeswara temple (in picture) is main focus of attention.

== Healthcare ==
In 2014, Jangipara CD Block had 1 rural hospital, 4 primary health centres and 6 private nursing homes with total 120 beds and 10 doctors (excluding private bodies). It had 36 family welfare subcentres. 2,300 patients were treated indoor and 355,840 patients were treated outdoor in the hospitals, health centres and subcentres of the CD Block.

Jangipara CD Block has Jangipara Rural Hospital (with 60 beds) at Jangipara, Mundalika Primary Health Centre (with 10 beds), Furfura PHC (with 10 beds), Guti PHC (with 4 beds) and Rajbalhat PHC (with 6 beds).

Jangipara CD Block is one of the areas of Hooghly district where ground water is affected by low level of arsenic contamination. The WHO guideline for arsenic in drinking water is 10 mg/ litre, and the Indian Standard value is 50 mg/ litre. In Hooghly district, 16 blocks have arsenic levels above WHO guidelines and 11 blocks above Indian standard value. The maximum concentration in Jangipara CD Block is 25 mg/litre.
