= Kolorah High School =

Location
- Howrah, West Bengal; India; 22.6074351°N 88.1976276°E

Information
- Established: 1907
- Campus type: Urban

Kolorah High School is a school located at Kolorah Howrah, India. This is a Bengali medium school and is affiliated to the West Bengal Board of Secondary Education for Madhyamik Pariksha (10th Board exams), and to the West Bengal Council of Higher Secondary Education for Higher Secondary Examination (12th Board exams). The school was founded in 1907.

== See also ==
- Education in India
- List of schools in India
- Education in West Bengal
