= Raghudebbati =

- Census Town
- Location in West Bengal, India Raghudebbati (India)
- Coordinates: 22.53°N 88.2°E
- Country: India
- State: West Bengal
- District: Howrah
- Elevation: 8 m (26 ft)

Population (2011)
  - Total: 14,165

Languages
  - Official: Bengali, English
- Time zone: UTC+5:30 (IST)
- Vehicle registration: WB
- Lok Sabha constituency: Howrah
- Vidhan Sabha constituency: Sankrail
- Website: howrah.gov.in

Raghudebbati is a census town in Sankrail CD Block of Howrah Sadar subdivision in Howrah district in the Indian state of West Bengal.

== Geography ==
Raghudebbati is located at 22.53°N 88.2°E. It has an average elevation of 8 metres (26 feet).

== Demographics ==
As per 2011 Census of India Raghudebbati had a total population of 14,165 of which 7,215 (51%) were males and 6,950 (49%) were females. Population below 6 years was 1,630. The total number of literates in Raghudebbati was 9,977 (79.59% of the population over 6 years).

Raghudebbati is part of Kolkata metropolitan Urban Agglomeration in 2011 census.

As of 2001 India census, Raghudebbati had a population of 11,878. Males constitute 51% of the population and females 49%. Raghudebbati has an average literacy rate of 58%, lower than the national average of 59.5%: male literacy is 65% and female literacy is 52%. In Raghudebbati, 14% of the population is under 6 years of age.

== Transport ==
Nalpur railway station on Howrah-Kharagpur line is the nearest railway station.
