= Makardaha =

- Census town
- Location in West Bengal, India Makardaha (India)
- Coordinates: 22.62°N 88.24°E
- Country: India
- State: West Bengal
- District: Howrah

Population (2011)
  - Total: 8,713

Languages
  - Official: Bengali, English
- Time zone: UTC+5:30 (IST)
- Vehicle registration: WB
- Lok Sabha constituency: Sreerampur
- Vidhan Sabha constituency: Domjur
- Website: howrah.gov.in

Makardah is a census town in Domjur CD Block of Howrah Sadar subdivision in Howrah district in the Indian state of West Bengal.

== Geography ==
Makardaha is located at 22.62°N 88.24°E. Saraswati River used to flow past the town.

== Demographics ==
As per 2011 Census of India, Makardaha had a total population of 8,713 of which 4,428 (51%) were males and 4,285 (49%) were females. Population below 6 years was 756. The total number of literates in Makardaha was 7,048 (88.58% of the population over 6 years).

Makardaha was part of Kolkata Urban Agglomeration in 2011 census.

As of 2001 India census, Makardaha had a population of 6,730. Males constitute 51% of the population and females 49%. Makardaha has an average literacy rate of 79%, higher than the national average of 59.5%: male literacy is 82% and female literacy is 75%. In Makardaha, 9% of the population is under 6 years of age.

== Transport ==
Amta Road (part of State Highway 15) is the artery of the town. Makardaha-Mahiari Road also starts from here.

=== Bus ===
==== Private Bus ====
- 63 Domjur - Howrah Station
- E44 Rampur - Howrah Station
- K11 Domjur - Rabindra Sadan

==== Mini Bus ====
- 16 Domjur - Howrah Station
- 31 Makardaha - Khidirpur
- 34 Purash - Howrah Station
- 35 Hantal - Howrah Station

==== CTC Bus ====
- C11 Domjur - B.B.D. Bagh/Belgachia
- C11/1 Munsirhat - Howrah Station

==== Bus Routes Without Numbers ====
- Bargachia - Sealdah Station (Barafkal)
- Pancharul - Howrah Station
- Udaynarayanpur - Howrah Station
- Rajbalhat - Howrah Station
- Tarakeswar - Howrah Station

=== Train ===
Jhaluarbar railway station and Makardaha railway station are situated 18 kilometres (11 mi) and 20 kilometres (12 mi) respectively from Howrah Station on Howrah-Amta line. It is part of the Kolkata Suburban Railway railway system.

== Culture ==
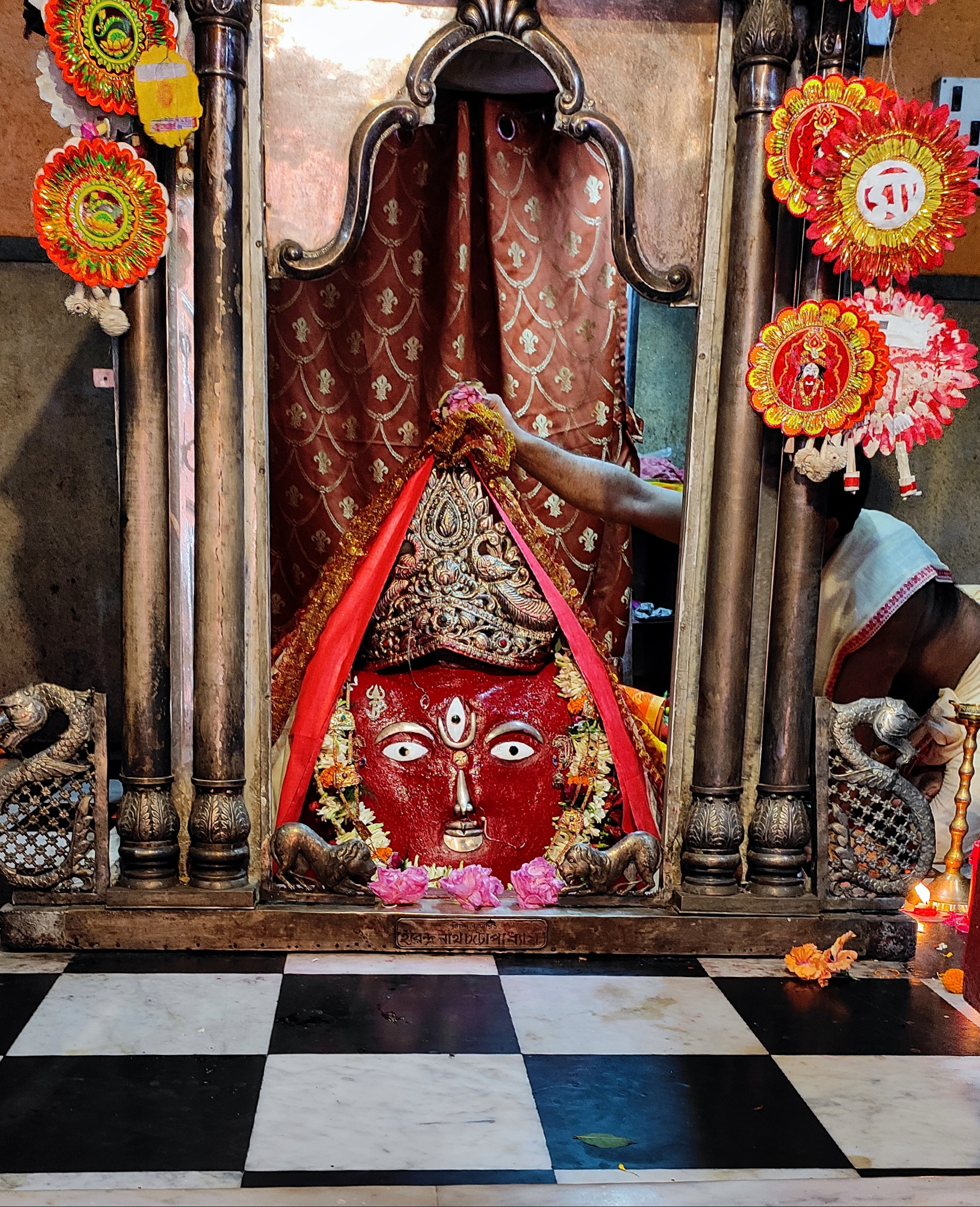
Makarchandi maa (goddess) of Makardaha, in Domjur, West Bengal.

The temple of Makarchandi is the main attraction here. The original temple is believed to have been built by Srimanta Sadagar, who received the command of the goddess Chandi (a manifestation of goddess Durga) in a dream while sailing along the once mighty Saraswati River. Three pieces of stone lying in the present temple complex are believed to be the remains of the old temple. The present temple was built in 1821 (1743 Shakbada / 1228 Bangabda) by Ramkanta Kundu Choudhury, zamindar of Mahiari or Mouri as per the foundation stone of the temple. The temple with a height of about 40 feet (12 m) was renovated by the Birla Trust in the year 1968. A fair is being organised on the occasion of local Panchamdol festival. It is celebrated during and after Holi or Doljatra.

== Notable people ==
- Sheikh Faiaz (born 1995), footballer
