= Jhaluarbar railway station =

Railway station in West Bengal

Jhaluarbar
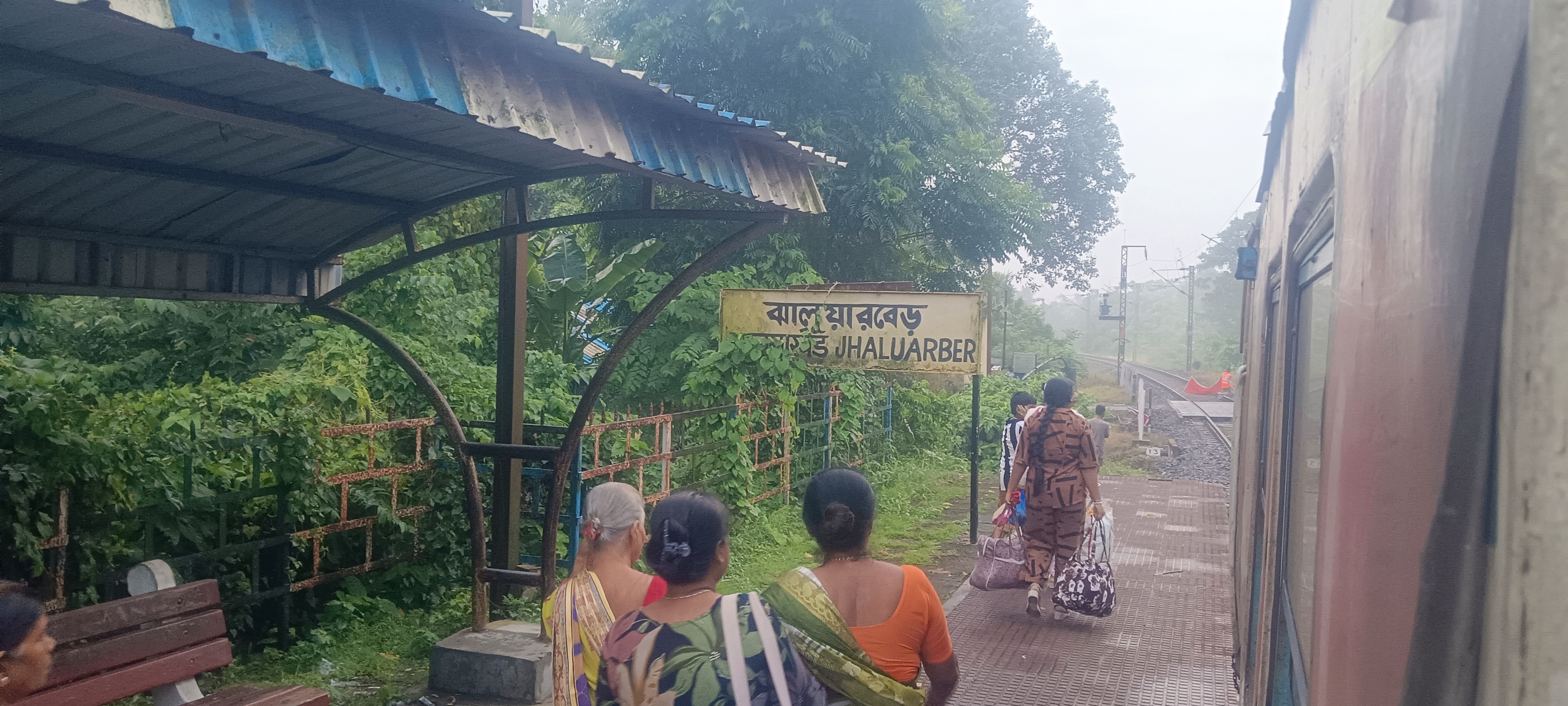
- Jhaluarbar Railway Station

General information
- Location: Jhaluarbar, Makardaha, Howrah District, West Bengal; India
- Coordinates: 22°37′40″N 88°15′10″E
- Elevation: 8 metres (26 ft)
- System: Suburban rail station
- Owner: Indian Railways
- Operator: South Eastern Railway zone
- Line: Santragachi–Amta branch line
- Platforms: 1
- Tracks: 1

Construction
- Structure type: Standard (on ground station)

Other information
- Status: Functioning
- Station code: JLBR
- Zone(s): South Eastern Railway zone
- Division(s): Kharagpur

History
- Opened: 1897
- Closed: 1971
- Rebuilt: 2004
- Former names: Howrah–Amta Light Railway

Services
| Preceding station | Kolkata Suburban Railway | Following station |
|---|---|---|
| Makardaha towards Amta | South Eastern Line Santragachi–Amta branch line | Dansi towards Howrah Junction |
Route map
- Source: Google Maps
Location
- Location within West Bengal Location within India

Jhaluarbar railway station is a railway station on Santragachi–Amta branch line of South Eastern Railway section of the Kharagpur railway division. It is situated at Jhaluarbar, Makardaha in Howrah District in the Indian state of West Bengal.

== History ==
Howrah to Amta narrow-gauge track was built in 1897 in British India. This route was the part of the Martin's Light Railways which was closed in 1971. Howrah–Amta new broad-gauge line, including the Bargachia–Champadanga branch line was re constructed and opened in 2002–2004.
