= Jhorhat =

- Census Town
- Location in West Bengal, India Jhorhat (India)
- Coordinates: 22.57°N 88.24°E
- Country: India
- State: West Bengal
- District: Howrah

Population (2011)
  - Total: 16,940

Languages
  - Official: Bengali, English
- Time zone: UTC+5:30 (IST)
- Vehicle registration: WB
- Lok Sabha constituency: Howrah
- Vidhan Sabha constituency: Sankrail
- Website: howrah.gov.in

Jhorhat is a census town in Sankrail CD Block of Howrah Sadar subdivision in Howrah district in the Indian state of West Bengal.

== Geography ==
Jhorhat is located at 22.57°N 88.24°E. It is adjacent to Andul.

== Demographics ==
As per 2011 Census of India Jhorhat had a total population of 16,940 of which 8,655 (51%) were males and 8,285 (49%) were females. Population below 6 years was 1,444. The total number of literates in Jhorhat was 13,713 (88.49% of the population over 6 years).

Jhorhat was part of Kolkata Urban Agglomeration in 2011 census.

As of 2001 India census, Jhorhat had a population of 16,123. Males constitute 54% of the population and females 46%. Jhorhat has an average literacy rate of 76%, higher than the national average of 59.5%: male literacy is 81% and female literacy is 69%. In Jhorhat, 8% of the population is under 6 years of age.

== Transport ==
Andul railway station on Howrah-Kharagpur line is the nearest railway station.
