= Howrah Sadar subdivision =

- Subdivision
- Interactive map of Howrah Sadar subdivision
- Coordinates: 22.5736296°N 88.3251045°E
- Country: India
- State: West Bengal
- District: Howrah
- Headquarters: Howrah

Population (2011)
  - Total: 2,811,344

Languages
  - Official: Bengali, English
- Time zone: UTC+5:30 (IST)
- ISO 3166 code: ISO 3166-2:IN
- Vehicle registration: WB
- Website: wb.gov.in

Howrah Sadar subdivision is a subdivision of the Howrah district in the state of West Bengal, India. It consists of Howrah municipal corporation and five community development blocs: Bally Jagacha, Domjur, Panchla, Sankrail and Jagatballavpur. The five blocks contain 67 gram panchayats and 44 census towns. The subdivision has its headquarters at Howrah.

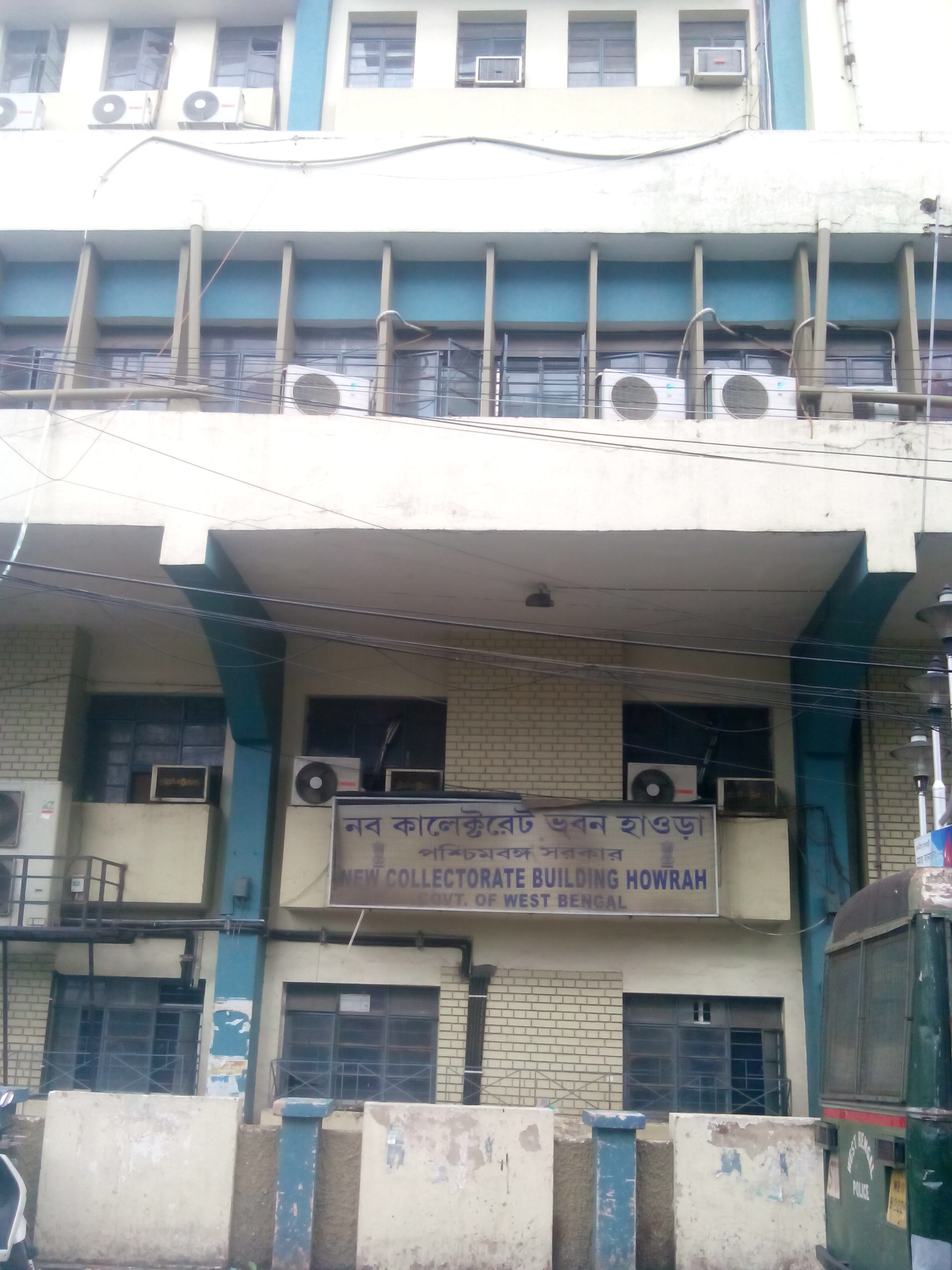
Howrah collectorate bhawan

== Area ==

Apart from the Howrah municipal corporation, the subdivision contains 44 census towns and rural areas of 67 gram panchayats under five community development blocs: Bally Jagacha, Domjur, Panchla, Sankrail and Jagatballavpur. The 44 census towns are: Bally (Jagachha), Chakapara, Chamrail, Eksara, Khalia, Jagadishpur, Domjur, Dakshin Jhapardaha, Khantora, Bhandardaha, Makardaha, Kantlia, Tentulkuli, Salap, Bankra, Nibra, Ankurhati, Bipra Noapara, Kalara, Kesabpur, Natibpur, Mahiari, Bikihakola, Beldubi, Jala Kendua, Gabberia, Paniara, Panchla, Sahapur, Argari, Dhuilya, Andul, Ramchandrapur, Podara, Panchpara, Hatgachha, Jhorhat, Banupur, Sankrail, Manikpur, Nalpur, Raghudebbati, Sarenga and Mansinhapur.

Map of Howrah District

== Blocks ==

=== Bally Jagachha block ===
Rural area under Bally Jagachha block consists of eight gram panchayats, viz. Bally, Durgapur Abhaynagar–I, Jagadishpur, Chakpara, Anandanagar, Nischinda, Durgapur Abhaynagar–II, Sanpuipara Basukati and Chamrail. Urban area under this block consists of six census towns: Bally (Jagachha), Chakapara, Chamrail, Eksara, Khalia and Jagadishpur. Bally & Liluah police stations serve this block. Headquarters of this block is in Kona.

=== Domjur block ===
Rural area under Domjur block consists of 18 gram panchayats, viz. Bankra–I, Dakshin Jhapardaha, Mahiyari–I, Parbatipur, Bankra–II, Mahiyari–II, Shalap–I, Bankra–III, Rudrapur, Makardah–I, Shalap–II, Begri, Kolora–I, Makardah–II, Uttar Jhapardaha, Domjur, Kolora–II and Narna. Urban area under this block consists of sixteen census towns: Domjur, Dakshin Jhapardaha, Khantora, Bhandardaha, Makardaha, Kantlia, Tentulkuli, Salap, Bankra, Nibra, Ankurhati, Bipra Noapara, Kalara, Kesabpur, Natibpur, and Mahiari. Domjur police station serves this block. Headquarters of this block is in Domjur.

=== Panchla block ===
Rural area under Panchla block consists of 11 gram panchayats, viz. Banharishpur, Chara–Panchla, Jalabiswanathpur, Sahapur, Beldubi, Deulpur, Jujarsaha, Suvarara, Bikihakola, Gangadharpur and Panchla. Urban area under this block consists of seven census towns: Bikihakola, Beldubi, Jala Kendua, Gabberia, Paniara, Panchla and Sahapur. Panchla police station serves this block. Headquarters of this block is in Bikihakola.

=== Sankrail block ===
Rural area under Sankrail block consists of 16 gram panchayats, viz. Andul, Dhulagari, Manikpur, Raghudebbati, Banupur–I, Duila, Mashila, Sankrail, Banupur–II, Jhorehat, Nalpur, Sarenga, Dakshin Sankrail, Kandua, Panchpara and Thanamakua. Urban area under this block consists of fourteen census towns: Argari, Dhuilya, Andul, Ramchandrapur, Podara, Panchpara, Hatgachha, Jhorhat, Banupur, Sankrail, Manikpur, Nalpur, Raghudebbati and Sarenga. Sankrail police station serves this block. Headquarters of this block is in Andul Mouri.

=== Jagatballavpur block ===
Rural area under Jagatballavpur block consists of 14 gram panchayats, viz. Baragachhia–I, Islampur, Maju, Shankarhati–II, Baragachhia–II, Jagatballavpur–maju changghurali north, Pantihal, Shialdanga, Gobindapur, Jagatballavpur–II, Polegustia, Hantal Anantabati, Laskarpur and Shankarhati–I. Urban area under this block consists of one census town: Mansinhapur. Jagatballavpur policem station serves this block. Headquarters of this block is in Munsirhat.

== Legislative segments ==
As per order of the Delimitation Commission in respect of the delimitation of constituencies in West Bengal:

- Wards numbered 51–66 of the Howrah Municipal Corporation will form the Bally assembly constituency of West Bengal.
- Wards numbered 1–7 and 10–16 of the Howrah municipal corporation will form the Howrah Uttar assembly constituency.
- Wards numbered 17–20, 24–34, 36, 37 and 42 of the Howrah municipal corporation will form the Howrah Madhya assembly constituency.
- Wards numbered 8, 9, 21–23, 43, 47–50 of the Howrah municipal corporation will form the Shibpur assembly constituency.
- Wards 35, 38–41, 44–46 of the Howrah municipal corporation and the gram panchayats of Dulia, Jorhat, Panchpara and Thanamakua of the Sankrail block will form the Howrah Dakshin assembly constituency.
- The other thirteen gram panchayats under the Sankrail block and the gram panchayats of Kolara–I, Kolara–II, Mahiyari–I and Mahiyari–II of the Domjur block will form the Sankrail assembly constituency.
- The Panchla block and the gram panchayats of Gobindapur, Islampur, Laskarpur and Polegustia of the Jagatballavpur block will together form the Panchla assembly constituency.
- The Jagatballavpur assembly constituency will cover the area under the other ten gram panchayats of the Jagatballavpur, and the gram panchayats of Begari, Domjur, Dakshin Jhapardaha, Parbatipur, Rudrapur, Uttar Jhapardaha and Makardah–I under the Domjur block.
- The Bally Jagachha block and the gram panchayats of Bankra–I, Bankra–II, Bankra–III, Makardah–II, Narna, Shalap–I and Shalap–II under the Domjur block will together form the Domjur assembly constituency.
- The Sankrail constituency will be reserved for Scheduled castes (SC) candidates.
- The assembly constituencies of Bally, Howrah Uttar, Howrah Madhya, Shibpur, Howrah Dakshin, Panchla and Sankrail will together form the Howrah (Lok Sabha constituency).
- The constituencies of Jagatballavpur and Domjur will be segments of the Sreerampur (Lok Sabha constituency).
