= Panchla =

- Census Town
- Location in West Bengal, India Panchla (India)
- Coordinates: 22.54°N 88.14°E
- Country: India
- State: West Bengal
- District: Howrah
- Elevation: 7 m (23 ft)

Population (2011)
  - Total: 26,432

Languages
  - Official: Bengali, English
- Time zone: UTC+5:30 (IST)
- PIN: 711322
- Vehicle registration: WB
- Lok Sabha constituency: Howrah
- Vidhan Sabha constituency: Panchla
- Website: howrah.gov.in

Panchla is a census town in Panchla CD Block of Howrah Sadar subdivision in Howrah district in the Indian state of West Bengal.

== Geography ==
Panchla is located at 22.54°N 88.14°E. It has an average elevation of 7 metres (22 feet).

== Demographics ==
As per 2011 Census of India Panchla had a total population of 26,432 of which 13,573 (51%) were males and 12,859 (49%) were females. Population below 6 years was 3,528. The total number of literates in Panchla was 18,730 (81.78% of the population over 6 years).

As of 2001 India census, Panchla had a population of 22,087. Males constitute 52% of the population and females 48%. Panchla has an average literacy rate of 63%, higher than the national average of 59.5%: male literacy is 69%, and female literacy is 58%. In Panchla, 15% of the population is under 6 years of age.
