= Makardaha railway station =

Railway station in West Bengal

Makardaha
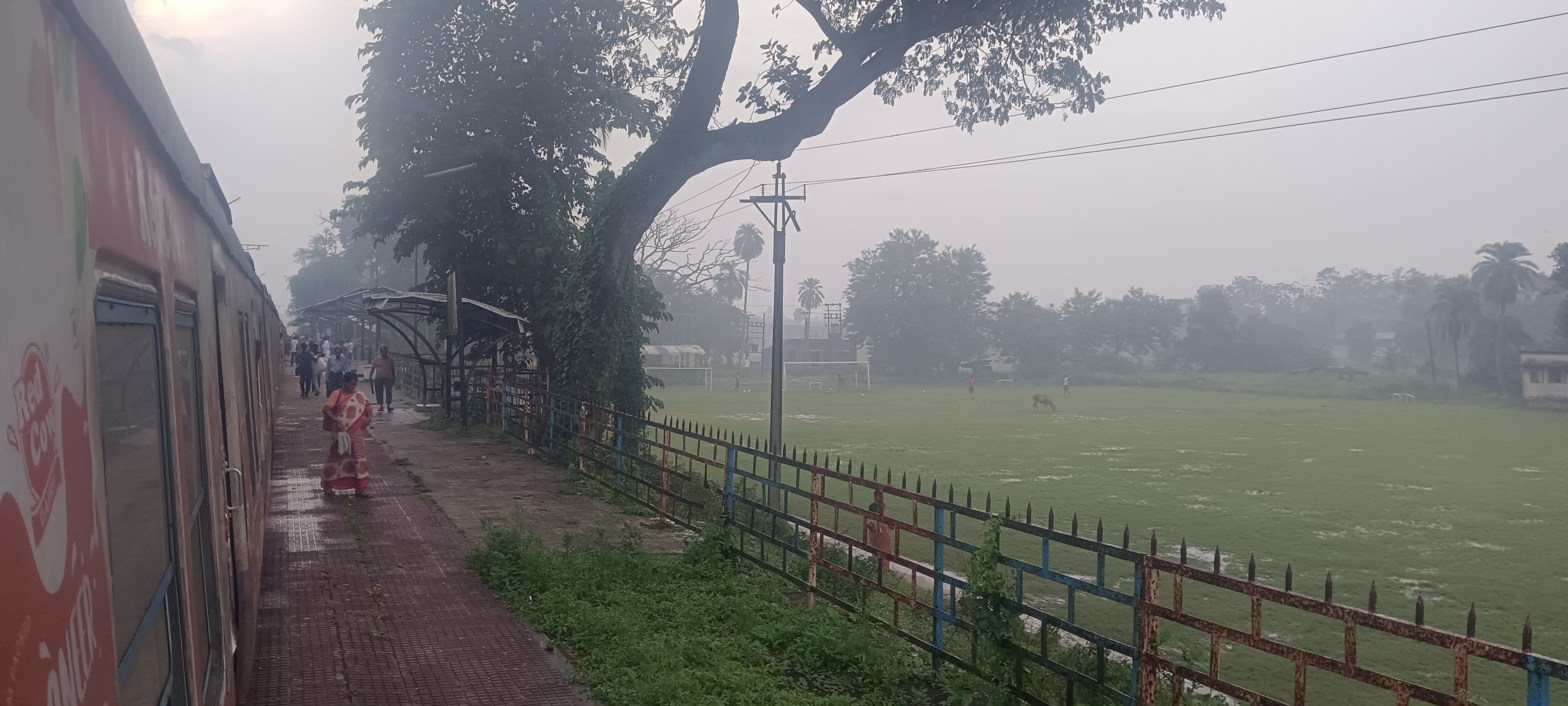
- Makardaha Railway Station

General information
- Location: Howrah–Amta Road, Makardaha, Howrah District, West Bengal; India
- Coordinates: 22°37′43″N 88°14′12″E
- Elevation: 8 metres (26 ft)
- System: Suburban rail station
- Owner: Indian Railways
- Operator: South Eastern Railway zone
- Line: Santragachi–Amta branch line
- Platforms: 1
- Tracks: 1

Construction
- Structure type: Standard (on ground station)

Other information
- Status: Functioning
- Station code: MDC
- Zone(s): South Eastern Railway zone
- Division(s): Kharagpur

History
- Opened: 1897
- Closed: 1971
- Rebuilt: 2004
- Former names: Howrah–Amta Light Railway

Services
Preceding station	Kolkata Suburban Railway	Following station
Domjur Road towards Amta	South Eastern Line Santragachi–Amta branch line	Jhaluarbar towards Howrah Junction
Route map
- Source: Google Maps
Location
- Location within West Bengal Location within India

Makardaha railway station is a railway station on Santragachi–Amta branch line of South Eastern Railway section of the Kharagpur railway division. It is situated beside Howrah–Amta Road at Makardaha in Howrah District in the Indian state of West Bengal.

== History ==
Howrah to Amta narrow-gauge track was built in 1897 in British India. This route was the part of the Martin's Light Railways which was closed in 1971. Howrah–Amta new broad-gauge line, including the Bargachia–Champadanga branch line was re constructed and opened in 2002–2004.
