= Bargachia =

- Census Town
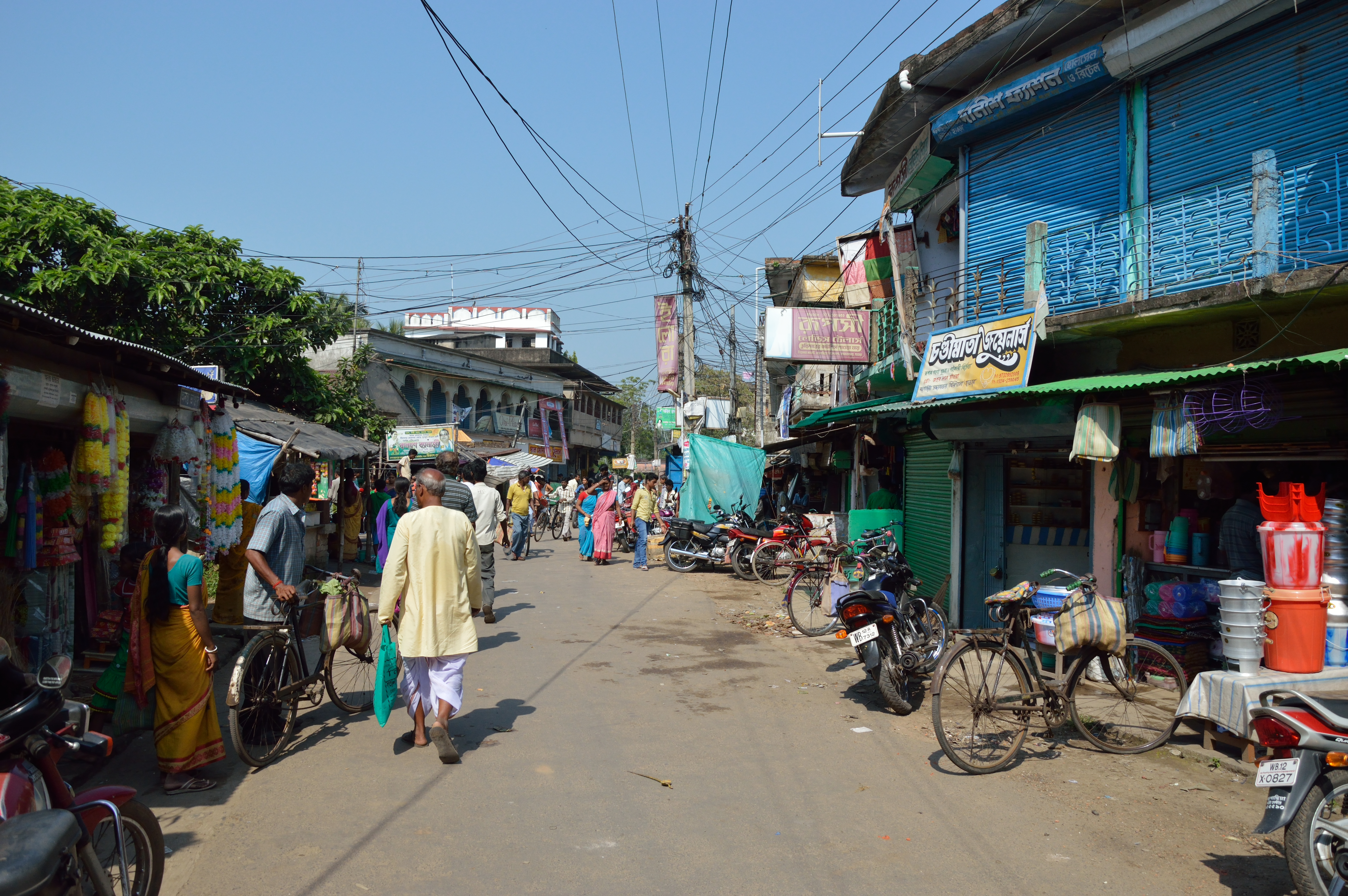
- Bargachia Sandhya Bazar
- Country: India
- State: West Bengal
- District: Howrah

Population (2025)
  - Total: 6,500

Languages
  - Official: Bengali, English
- Time zone: UTC+5:30 (IST)
- Postal code: 711404
- Vehicle registration: WB
- Website: howrah.gov.in

Bargachia is a census town in Jagatballavpur CD Block of Howrah Sadar subdivision in Howrah district in the Indian state of West Bengal.
