= Panchla Assembly constituency =

Panchla
- Constituency No. 175 for the West Bengal Legislative Assembly
- Interactive Map Outlining Panchla Assembly Constituency

Constituency details
- Country: India
- Region: East India
- State: West Bengal
- District: Howrah
- Lok Sabha constituency: Howrah
- Established: 1962
- Total electors: 206,646
- Reservation: None

Member of Legislative Assembly
- 18th West Bengal Legislative Assembly
- Incumbent Gulsan Mullick
- Party: Democratic Trinamool Congress
- Elected year: 2026

Panchla Assembly constituency is an assembly constituency in Howrah district in the Indian state of West Bengal.

== Overview ==
As per orders of the Delimitation Commission, No. 175 Panchla Assembly constituency (SC) is composed of the following: Panchla community development block and Gobindapur, Islampur, Laskarpur, Polegustia gram panchayats of Jagatballavpur community development block.

Panchla Assembly constituency is part of No. 25 Howrah (Lok Sabha constituency). Panchla was earlier part of Sreerampur (Lok Sabha constituency).

== Members of the Legislative Assembly ==
Year	Name	Party
1962	Apurba Lal Mazumdar	All India Forward Bloc
1967	A.P. Mukhopadhyay	Indian National Congress
1969	Kanai Lal Bhattacharya	All India Forward Bloc
1971	Ashoke Kumar Ghose	Communist Party of India (Marxist)
1972	Sk Anwar Ali	Indian National Congress
1977	Santosh Kumar Das	All India Forward Bloc
1982	Anwar Ali Sheikh	Indian National Congress
1987	Sailen Mondal	All India Forward Bloc
1991	Sailen Mondal	All India Forward Bloc
1996	Gulsan Mullick	Indian National Congress
2001	Sailen Mondal	All India Forward Bloc
2006	Doli Roy	All India Forward Bloc
2011	Gulsan Mullick	Trinamool Congress
2016	Gulsan Mullick	Trinamool Congress
2021	Gulsan Mullick	Trinamool Congress
2026	Gulsan Mullick	Trinamool Congress

== Election results ==
=== 2026 ===
2026 West Bengal Legislative Assembly election: Panchla
Party	Candidate	Votes	%	±%
AITC	Gulsan Mullick	123,967	52.72	+4.53
BJP	Ranjan Kumar Paul	85,647	36.42	+3.32
AIFB	Farid Mollah	20,644	8.78	
NOTA	None of the above	1,739	0.74	−0.37
Majority		38,320	16.3	+1.21
Turnout		235,163	94.63	+13.1
AITC hold		Swing		

=== 2021 ===
2021 West Bengal Legislative Assembly election: Panchla
Party	Candidate	Votes	%	±%
AITC	Gulsan Mullick	104,572	48.19	
BJP	Mohit Lal Ghanti	71,821	33.1	
Indian Secular Front	Abdul Jalil Sheikh	35,576	16.39	
NOTA	None of the above	2,411	1.11	
Majority		32,751	15.09	
Turnout		217,009	81.53	
AITC hold		Swing		

=== 2016 ===
2016 West Bengal Legislative Assembly election: Panchla
Party	Candidate	Votes	%	±%
AITC	Gulsan Mullick	101,126	52.98	▲7.22
AIFB	Doli Roy	69,199	36.25	▼2.28
BJP	Bhabani Prasad Ray	16,066	8.42	▲3.93
NOTA	None of the Above	1,852	0.97	
Independent	Shyamal Mondal	1,018	0.53	▼0.45
Majority		31,927	16.73	▲9.5
Turnout		1,90,868	81.12	▲0.1
AITC hold		Swing		

=== 2011 ===
2011 West Bengal Legislative Assembly election: Panchla
Party	Candidate	Votes	%	±%
AITC	Gulsan Mullick	76,628	45.76	
AIFB	Doli Roy	64,510	38.53	
Independent	Mohit Lal Ghanti	14,487	8.65	
BJP	Shyamal Kumar Adak	7,523	4.49	
BSP	Shakirul Islam Sheikh	1,870	1.12	
Independent	Shyamal Mondal	1,637	0.98	
PDCI	Mohiuddin Mollah	785	0.47	
Majority		12,118	7.23	
Turnout		1,67,440	81.02	
AITC gain from AIFB		Swing		

=== 2006 ===
In the 2006 state assembly elections, Doli Roy of Forward Bloc won the Panchla assembly seat defeating her nearest rival Abul Kassem Molla of Trinamool Congress. Contests in most years were multi cornered but only winners and runners are being mentioned. Sailen Mondal of Forward Bloc defeated Sk. Nazrul Islam of Trinamool Congress in 2001. Gulsan Mullick of Congress defeated Sailen Mondal of Forward Bloc in 1996. Sailen Mondal of Forward Bloc defeated Prafulla Santra of Congress in 1991, and Anwar Ali Sheikh of Congress in 1987. Anwar Ali Sheikh of Congress defeated Santosh Kumar Das of Forward Bloc in 1982. Santosh Kumar Das of Forward Bloc defeated Anwar Ali Sheikh of Congress in 1977.

=== 1972 ===
Sk Anwar Ali of Congress won in 1972. Asoke Kumar Ghosh of CPI(M) won in 1971. Kanai Lal Bhattacharya of Forward Bloc won in 1969. A.P.Mukhopadhyay of Congress won in 1967. Apurba Lal Majumdar of Forward Bloc won in 1962. The Panchla seat did not exist prior to that.
