= Rajbalhat =

- Census Town
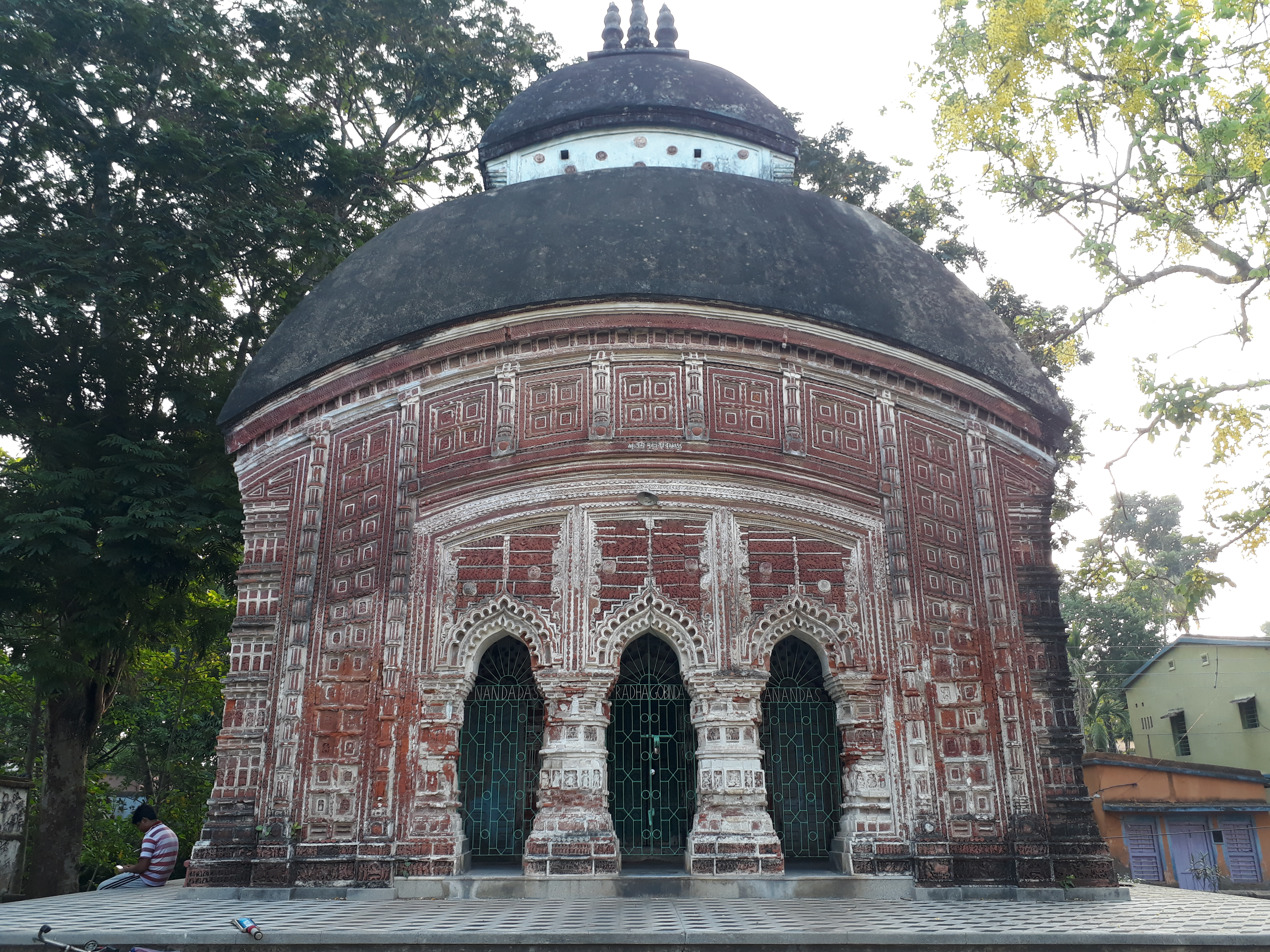
- Radhakantajiu Temple, Rajbalhat

- Location in West Bengal, India Rajbalhat (India)
- Coordinates: 22.7758°N 88.0054°E
- Country: India
- State: West Bengal
- District: Hooghly
- Elevation: 14 m (46 ft)

Population (2011)
  - Total: 16,479

Languages
  - Official: Bengali, English
- Time zone: UTC+5:30 (IST)
- PIN: 712408
- Telephone code: 03212
- ISO 3166 code: IN-WB
- Vehicle registration: WB
- Website: wb.gov.in

Rajbalhat is a census town in Jangipara, a Community development block of Srirampore subdivision in Hooghly district in the Indian state of West Bengal.

== Geography ==
Cities and towns in Chanditala I, Chanditala II and Jangipara CD Blocks in Srirampore subdivision in Hooghly district
M: municipal city/ town, CT: census town, R: rural/ urban centre,
Owing to space constraints in the small map, the actual locations in a larger map may vary slightly

=== Location ===
Rajbalhat is located at 22.7758°N 88.0054°E

Villages in Rajbalhat panchayat are as follows: Rajbalhat, Shib Chak, Morhal, Mukundapur, Kuliara, Jhanda, Binodbati, Chaiman Chak, Naskardanga, Gultia, Dakshin Gultia, Tripan, Nabagram, Jabni and Rahimpur.

=== Urbanisation ===
Srirampore subdivision is the most urbanized of the subdivisions in Hooghly district. 73.13% of the population in the subdivision is urban and 26.88% is rural. The subdivision has 6 municipalities and 34 census towns. The municipalities are: Uttarpara Kotrung Municipality, Konnagar Municipality, Serampore Municipality, Baidyabati Municipality, Rishra Municipality and Dankuni Municipality. Amongst the CD Blocks in the subdivision, Uttarapara Serampore (census towns shown in a separate map) had 76% urban population, Chanditala I 42%, Chanditala II 69% and Jangipara 7% (census towns shown in the map above). All places marked in the map are linked in the larger full screen map.

== Demographics ==
As per 2011 Census of India, Rajbalhat had a total population of 16,479 of which 8,405 (51%) were males and 8,074 (49%) were females. Children under 6 made up 1,419 people. The number of literate people in Rajbalhat was 12,530 (83.20% of the population over 6 years).

== Culture ==
The garh (fort) of Bhursut Raj at Rajbalhat covers about seven bighas of land (roughly 4.3 acres) and 500 bighas of land was a debottar property for the maintenance of the temple of Rajballavi Thakurani at Rajbalhat. No signs remain of the king's garh, or palace. Rajballavi Temple dates to approximately the early 16th century.

Radhakantajiu (1733) and Sridhar Damodar (1724) are 18th century temples with terracotta decorations in Rajbalhat village.

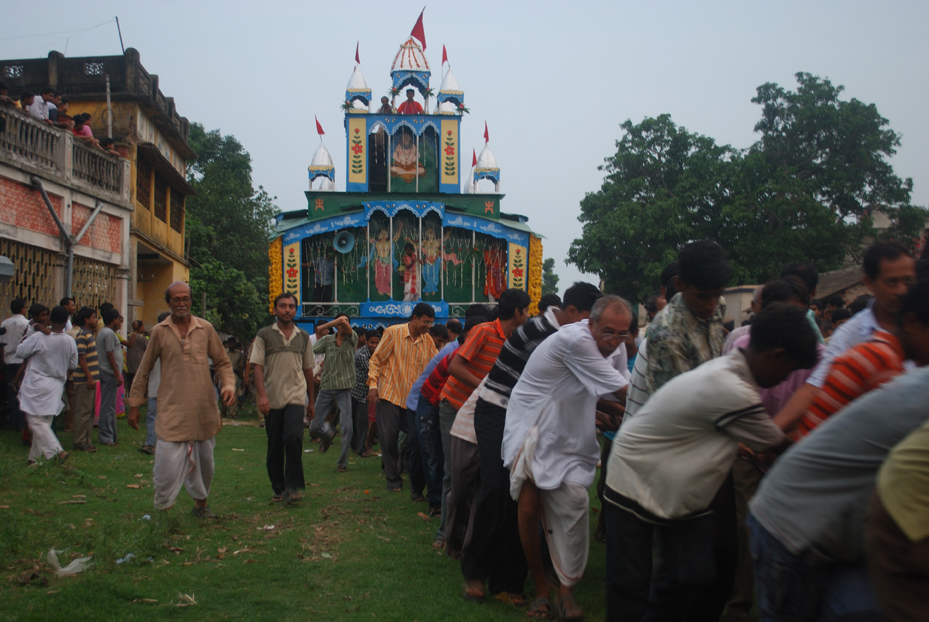
Rathyatra (chariot festival), Rajbalhat

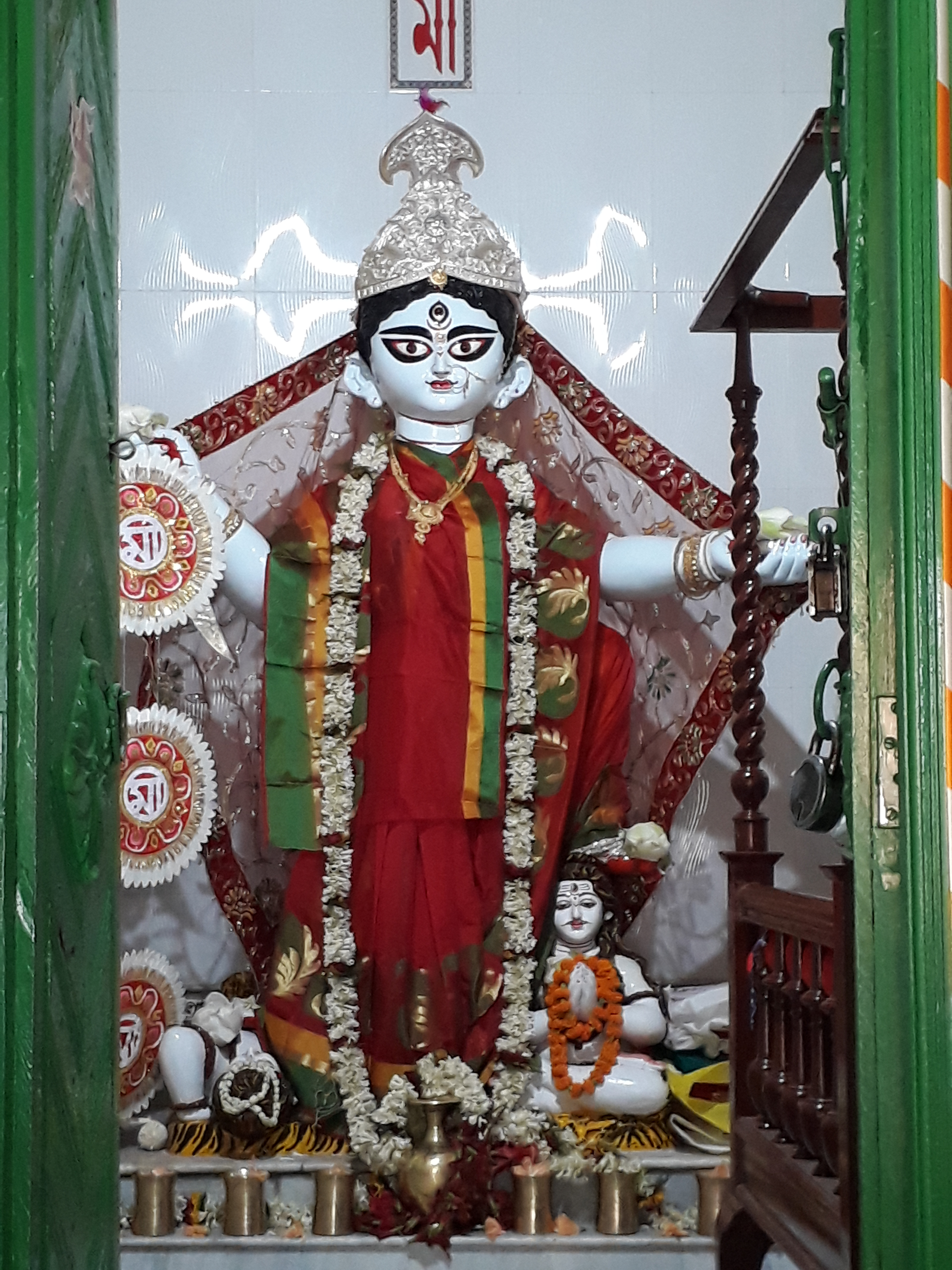
The Hindu goddess Rajballavi's image in Rajballavi Temple, Rajbalhat
