= Podrah =

Podrah Padmarajpur
- Neighbourhood in Howrah
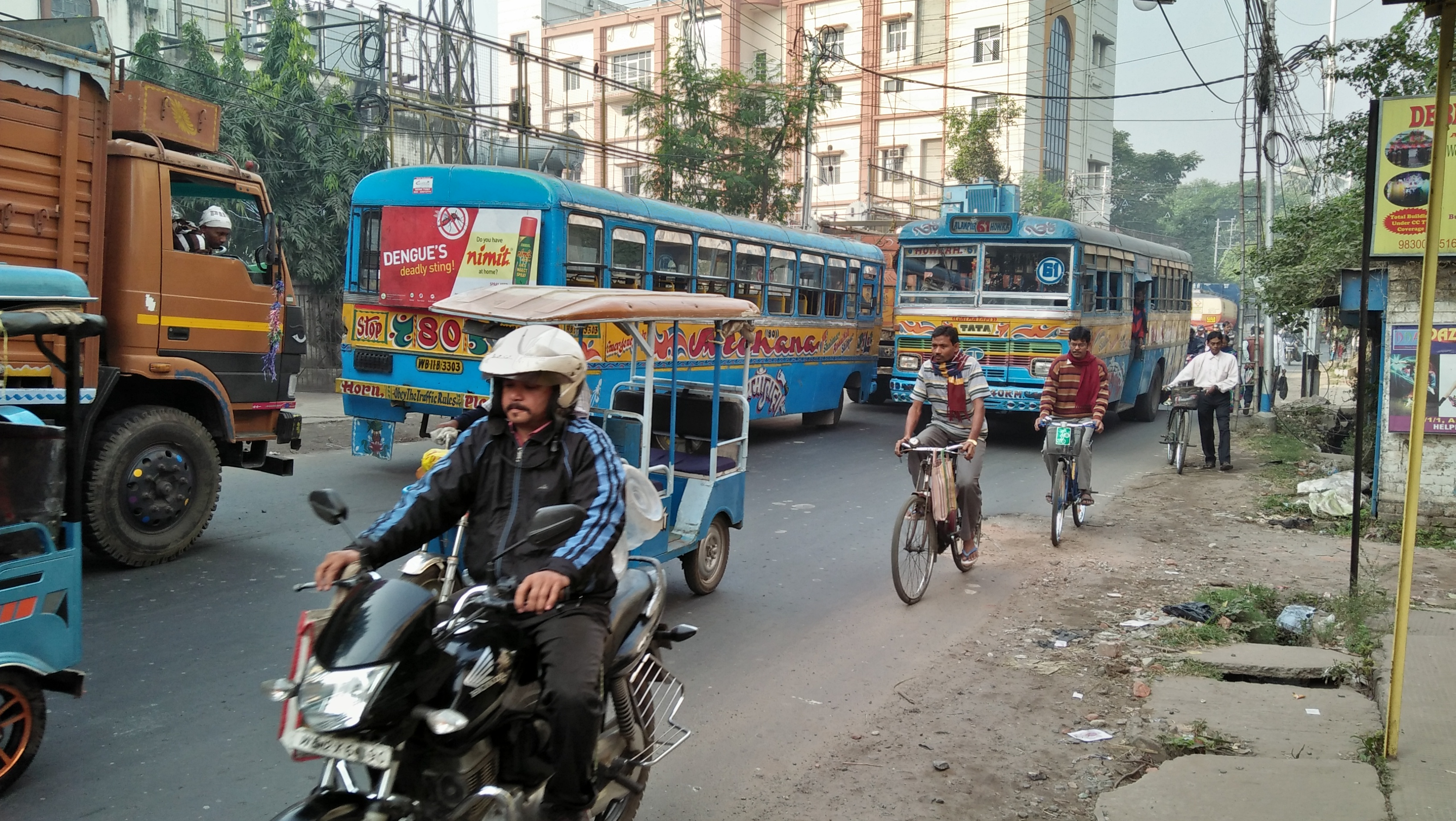
- Andul Road (part of SH 6), Podra

- Location in West Bengal, India Podrah (West Bengal) Podrah (India)
- Coordinates: 22.563000°N 88.272689°E
- Country: India
- State: West Bengal
- District: Howrah
- Elevation: 12 m (39 ft)

Population (2011)
  - Total: 21,589

Languages
  - Official: Bengali, English
- Time zone: UTC+5:30 (IST)
- PIN: 711109
- Vehicle registration: WB
- Lok Sabha constituency: Howrah
- Vidhan Sabha constituency: Howrah Dakshin
- Website: howrah.gov.in

Podrah or Padmarajpur (as known in ancient times) is a neighbourhood of South Howrah in Howrah district in the Indian state of West Bengal. This area falls under the jurisdiction of Sankrail PS of Howrah City Police. It consists of many small localities like Shibtala, Barowaritala, Vivekananda Nagar, Natun Pally, Chunavati, Balaji Nagar, Halderpara, and Vidyasagar Pally. Podrah is a part of the Howrah Dakshin (Constituency No: 173) Vidhan Sabha Constituency.

Podrah is also a census town under Sankrail CD Block of Howrah Sadar subdivision. It houses one of the largest multispeciality hospitals in the district of Howrah, NH Multispeciality Hospital.

== Toponymy ==
- Padma - In Bengali and Sanskrit, means Lotus. Also, the name for the goddess Lakshmi and the sacred river Padma in Bengal (the main distributary of the Ganges in Bangladesh).
- Rajpur - From Raj means (king, royal, rule).
- Pur - From Pur means (town or settlement).
- Padmarajpur - it could symbolically mean "The town of the lotus king" or "the royal place of the lotus".

== Geography ==
Podrah is flanked by Santragachhi and Green Park in the North, Shibpur in the East, Garden Reach and the Ganges River in the South and Mullick Para Lane, Chunabhati Road and Mourigram in the West.

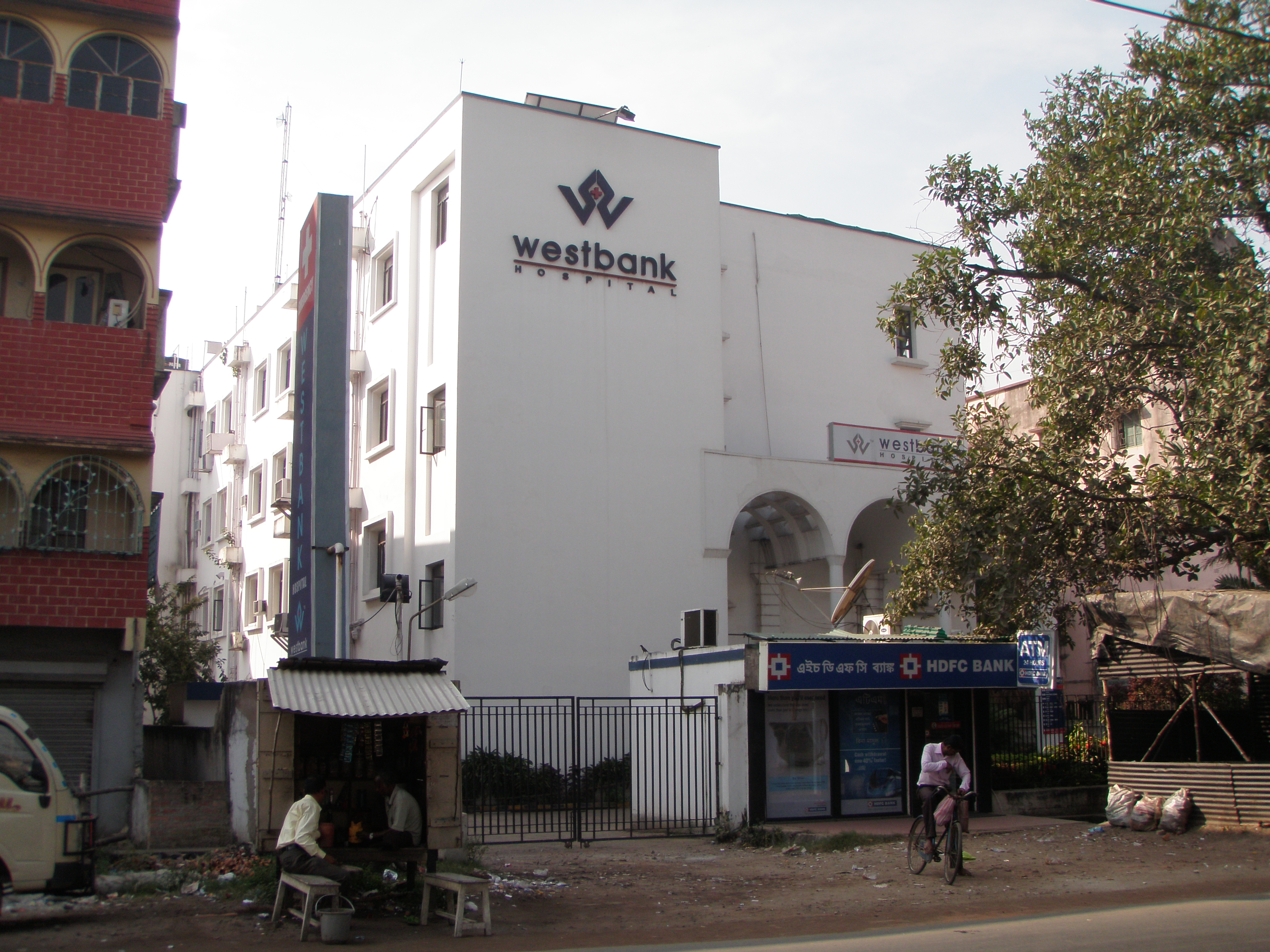
NH Narayana Multispeciality Hospital (Formerly Westbank Hospital), Andul Road, Podrah

== Demographics ==
Podara was a part of the Kolkata Urban Agglomeration in the 2011 census.

As per the 2011 Census of India, Podara had a total population of 21,589, of which 11,220 (52%) were males, and 10,369 (48%) were females. The age of 91.54% of the population is above 6 years, and 2,143 people were younger than 6. The literacy rate is 82.45%.

== Healthcare ==
Narayana Multispeciality Hospital, Howrah (formerly known as Westbank Hospital), sister hospital of Narayana Superspeciality Hospital, Howrah, is a multi-speciality hospital of Narayana Health on Andul Road, Howrah, West Bengal. Its proximity to Kolkata makes it accessible to patients from the metropolis. The hospital has 150 beds in unit 1 and 250 beds in unit 2.

The hospital was a subsidiary of Meridian Medical Research & Hospital Limited (MMRHL). This public limited company was acquired by the Narayana Health group, headed by renowned cardiac surgeon Dr Devi Prasad Shetty, in 2014. MMRHL initially operated the hospital for 15 years.

== Historical places ==
Podrah Mahakali Mandir, located at Podrah Barowaritala.

It has been maintained by Podrah Barowari Samity (Estd. 1893). The organisation maintains the 132-year-old Maha Kali Mandir. It was the year 1893. Human history was in the last decade of the 19th century. The time period was one of the golden periods of Bengal, flourishing in spirituality, literature, arts, science, mysticism, nationalism, etc. Late 19th-century Bengal must be equated with the rise of nationalism, education, ideas, enlightenment and empowerment. Bengali legendary names that emerged in this era are like Ma Sarada Devi, Vivekananda, Bankim Chandra Chattopadhyay, Girish Chandra Ghosh, Acharya Jagadish Chandra Bose, Rabindranath Tagore, Rishi Aurobindo Ghosh, etc., and many more were still walking on their feet on this great soil of Bengal. Subhash Chandra Basu, Satyendra Nath Bose, Kazi Nazrul Islam, Sarala Devi Chaudhurani, Pritilata Waddedar and many were their notable successors. During this era, these visionaries were roaring on their peak in the process of reforming the society of Bengal and Bharatvarsh on human progress and spiritual evolution through their intellect, outlook, social work, etc. Embedded in this was a severe pushback of anti-West conservatism and a harking back to Hindutva that formed the core of a parallel, exclusionary nationalism. Vandemataram already became a household blood boiler in this period. During this time in 1893, inspired by the above legends, blood-boiling boiled energetic youths in the village of Padmarajpur (currently known as Podrah) in Bengal, decided the uplift the spirituality among the people of the area. Thus, they established the Padmarajpur Mahakali Mandir in 1893. (currently known as Podrah Kali Mandir). Later, in 1923, the mandir also started celebrating Durga Puja every year, alongside Kali Puja. Since then, the tradition has continued, and this year, in May 2025, we celebrated the completion of 133 years of Kali Puja and Mandir. Alongside, in 2025, 103 years of Durga Puja will be celebrated. The successors of those young, energetic youths from 1893 carry forward this age-old tradition till today.

== Transport ==
- Road: Andul Road (part of Grand Trunk Road/State Highway 6) is the main artery of the town.

=== Bus ===
==== Private Bus ====
- 61 Alampur - Howrah Station
- 80 Chunabhati - Howrah Station

==== Mini Bus ====
- 13 Ranihati - Rajabazar
- 13A Fatikgachi - Rajabazar
- 20 Alampur - Ultadanga Station
- 20A Mourigram - Salt Lake Tank no. 13

==== Bus Route Without Number ====
- Andul railway station - New Town Ecospace

=== Train ===
Mourigram railway station on Howrah-Kharagpur line is the nearest railway station.
