= Dhuilya =

- Census Town
- Location in West Bengal, India Dhuilya (India)
- Coordinates: 22.57°N 88.24°E
- Country: India
- State: West Bengal
- District: Howrah

Population (2011)
  - Total: 20,962

Languages
  - Official: Bengali, English
- Time zone: UTC+5:30 (IST)
- Vehicle registration: WB
- Lok Sabha constituency: Howrah
- Vidhan Sabha constituency: Sankrail
- Website: howrah.gov.in

Dhuilya is a census town in Sankrail CD Block of Howrah Sadar subdivision in Howrah district in the Indian state of West Bengal.

== Geography ==
Dhuilya is located at 22°34′37″N 88°14′56″E. It is adjacent to Mourigram and Andul.

== Demographics ==
As per 2011 Census of India Dhuilya had a total population of 20,962 of which 10,569 (50%) were males and 10,393 (50%) were females. Population below 6 years was 1,681. The total number of literates in Dhuilya was 17,467 (90.59% of the population over 6 years).

Dhuliya was part of Kolkata Urban Agglomeration in 2011 census.

As of 2001 India census, Dhuilya had a population of 18,399. Males constitute 52% of the population and females 48%. Dhuilya has an average literacy rate of 81%, higher than the national average of 59.5%: male literacy is 85% and female literacy is 77%. In Dhuilya, 8% of the population is under 6 years of age.

== Transport ==
Andul Road (part of Grand Trunk Road/State Highway 6) is the artery of the town.

=== Bus ===
==== Private Bus ====
- 61 Alampur - Howrah Station

==== Mini Bus ====
- 13 Ranihati - Rajabazar
- 13A Fatikgachi - Rajabazar
- 20 Alampur - Ultadanga Station
- 20A Mourigram - Salt Lake Tank no. 13

==== Bus Routes Without Numbers ====
- Mourigram railway station - Barrackpur Cantonment
- Andul railway station - New Town Ecospace

=== Train ===
Mourigram railway station and Andul railway station on Howrah-Kharagpur line serve the locality.
