= Andul Dutta Chaudhury Family =

Family

Emblem (or Seal) of the family
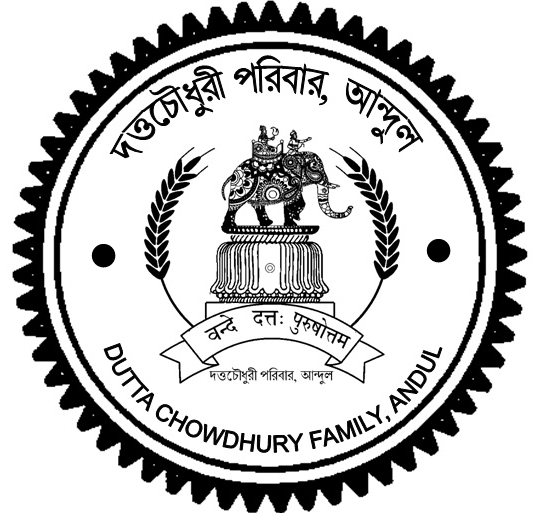
- Armiger: Chowdhury of Muzaffarpur pargana.
- Crest: A leader of noble rank (zamindar) is riding on an elephant. The two Leaf-Stalks around the elephant represent Revenue. Forming an integral part of the emblem is the motto inscribed in the ribbon banner in Devanagari script. Below the ribbon banner is written in Bengali - দত্তচৌধুরী পরিবার, আন্দুল (Dutta Chaudhury family, Andul).
- Motto: वन्दे दत्तः पुरुषोत्तम (Vande Dattah Purushottama): "Glory to Purushottam Dutta",, the founding-father of the clan.
- Use: The emblem is used by the family exclusively for non-commercial and non-profit purposes.
- The emblem got Copyright Registration under Government of India.

Dutta Chaudhury family (Devanagari: दत्तचौधरी परिवार, Bengali: দত্তচৌধুরী পরিবার, Farsi: دوت چوودی) or the 'Duttas of Andul' were the erstwhile Chaudhury (-ies) & zamindars, during Sultanate and Mughal periods, of Muzaffarpur pargana of the administrative unit of the 'Sarkar of Satgaon' (present-day Howrah and Hooghly districts) of Subah Bangla. The pargana further consisted of several revenue collection units referred to as moujas, namely Andul, Mahiary, Alampore, Dhulagore, Sankrail, Kendua, etc. The Dutta Chaudhury family was founded by zamindar Debdas (Tekari) Dutta, in the late 14th century CE. Since zamindar Tekari acquired almost the entire pargana as his estate ownership, from his father, he was designated as 'Chaudhury' (Farsi: چوودی) (Collector) of the pargana by Sikandar Shah, the second Sultan of Bengal.

It is believed that name of the place 'Andul' was derived from the word Anand-er-Dhuli (আনন্দের ধূলি), meaning 'dust of joy', coined by Krishnananda Dutta, the fourth Chaudhury & Zamindar of the pargana.

The family is an offshoot of Duttas of Bally of Southern – Rarh region, founded by Purushottam Dutta.

Once upon a time, the functional title of 'Chowdhury' for a collector of a pargana is no more functional but the family members of present-day still use it, as a legacy, along with their original surname 'Dutta' thus forming a composite surname - 'Dutta Chowdhury'. The present descendants of the family are scattered throughout India, Bangladesh and United States. A large genealogical tree of this family is there at the residence of Banbehari Datta Chowdhury at Chowdhury Para in Andul.

== Ratnakar's Philosopher's stone ==
There is a saying of getting a Philosopher's stone (Bengali: পরশ পাথর) from the river Ganga in Bally when zamindar Tekari's elder son would-be-Chaudhury Ratnakar Dutta was busy cleaning up his copper utensils on the bank of the river.

== Kuladevta temple of the family ==
Kashiswar Jiu temple (কাশীশ্বর জিউ মন্দির) is in Andul of Howrah district near the Saraswati river, West Bengal in India. The presiding deity is a Banlinga which was recovered from the river in mid-17th century CE by family's Kashiswar Dutta Chowdhury (b.1607 CE). In 18th century CE a stone made yoni-like structure commonly known as Gauripatta, symbolizes goddess Shakti, has been attached with the Linga.

There are other Shiva linga temples in the debottur premises, namely Bisheshwar (Lord of the Universe), Nakuleswar (Destroyer of ego) and Saurendra Mohaneshwar (Shiva is the lord of every material things of the Solar System).

Chowdhury MadhavChandra RayBahadur, the 22nd descendant of the family installed Madhaveshwar Shiva temple at Chowdhury para in Andul in the year 1757 CE.

== Durga puja in the family ==
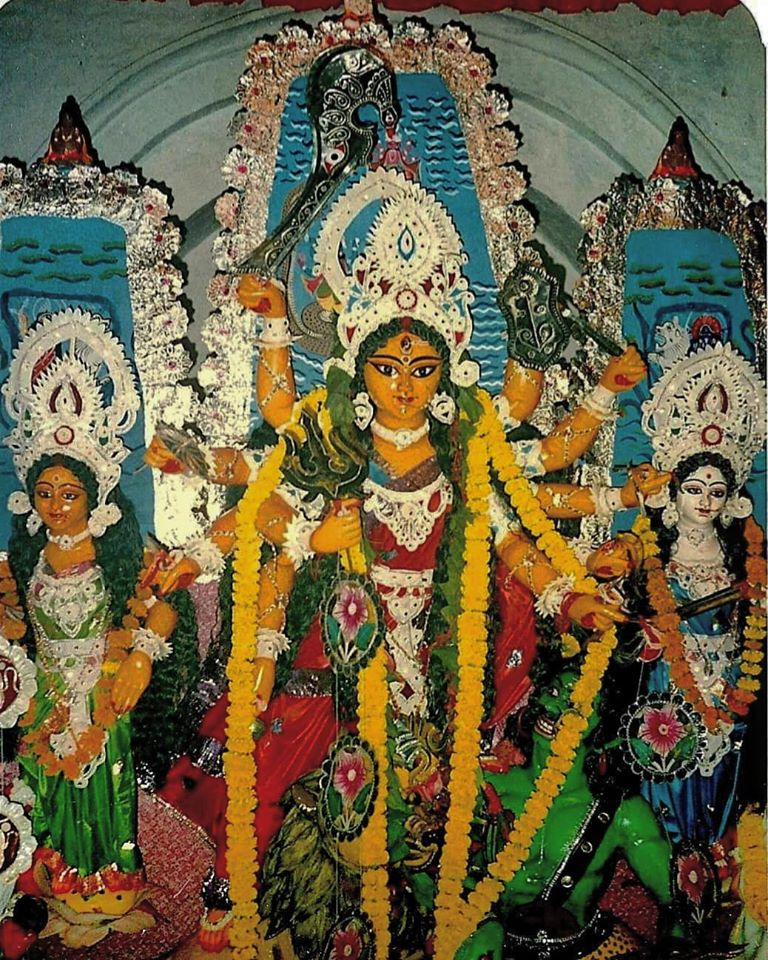
Durga puja of the Dutta Chowdhury family in Andul. Aritisian - Becharam Adhikary (Becha poto). Photo - 1988 CE.

Family celebrates autumnal festival (Durga puja) since the time of their forefather Ram Sharan Dutta Chowdhury (1548–1606 CE); he initiated the annual festival in the Saka era of 1490, which corresponds to 1568 CE in the Gregorian calendar at the ancestral village.

Family's Radha-Madhava deities are presently located in Odisha, which was taken from Andul to Chhoti village of Odisha by Ramsharan's grandfather Krishnananda.

== As Diwan ==
Golok Chandra Chowdhury was the Diwan of Andul Raj Estate under Raja RajNarayan RoyBahadur and Biswambar Chowdhury was the Diwan of the Mullick family of Andul.

== Notable personalities of the family ==
- Krishnananda Dutta Chaudhury
- Akshay Chandra Chaudhury
- Basanta Choudhury

== Photo gallery ==
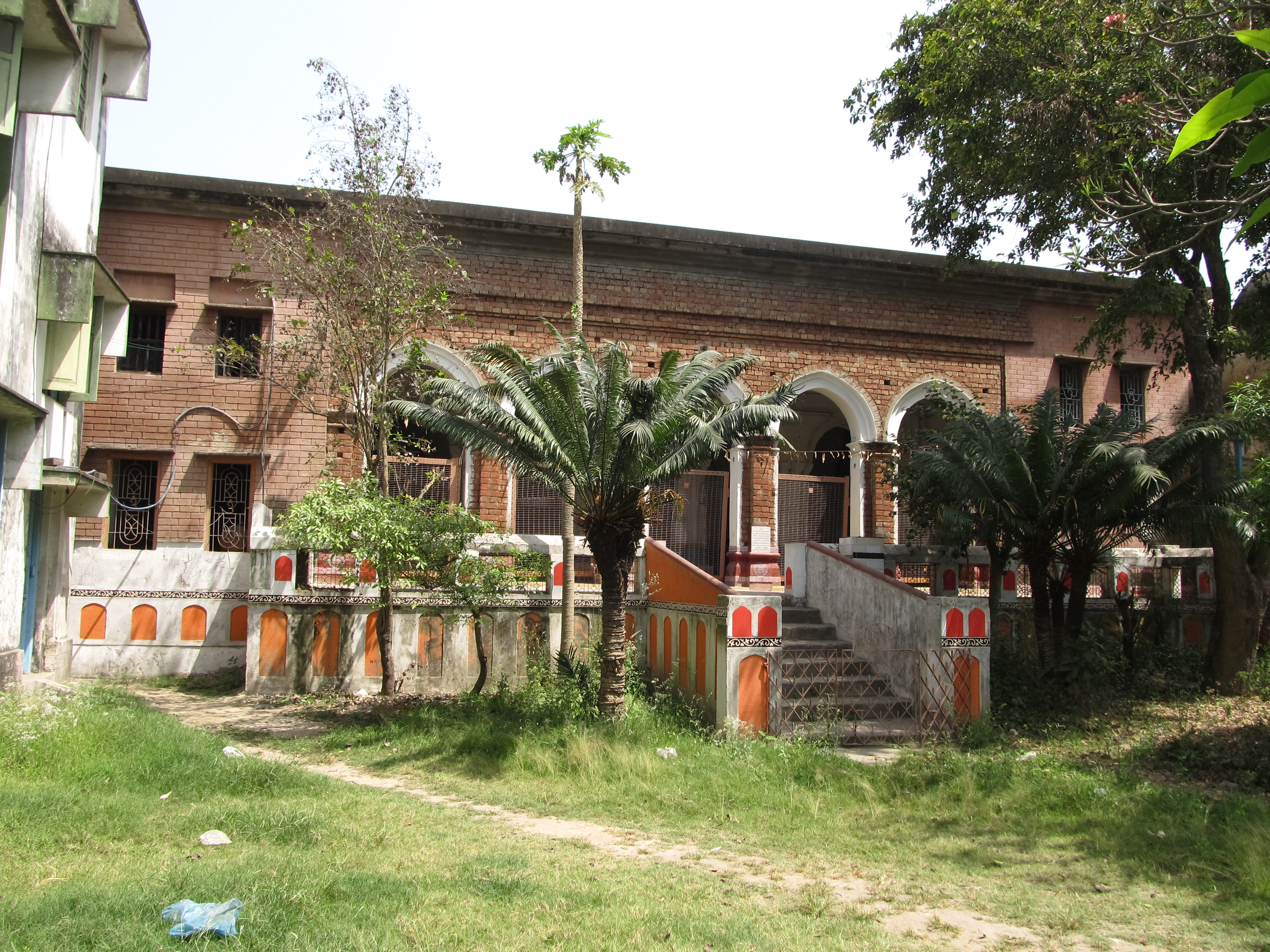
Durga-dalan of the Chowdhury family at Chowdhury para in Andul, reconstructed in the year 1930 CE.

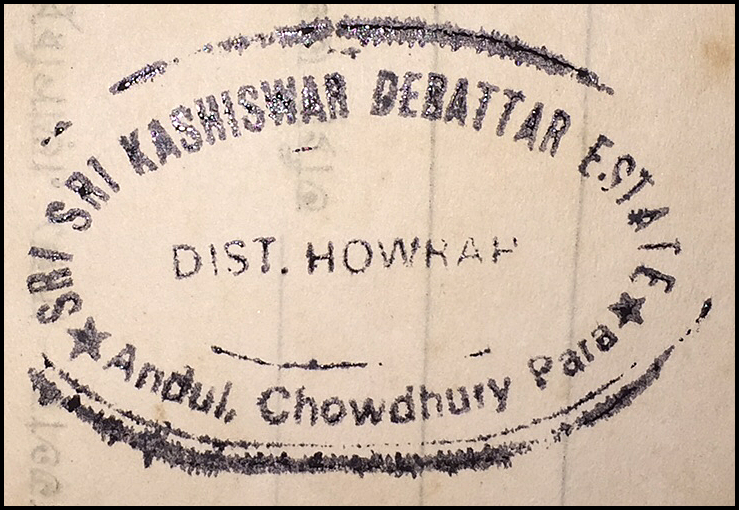
Seal of the family's Debottur Estate in Andul.

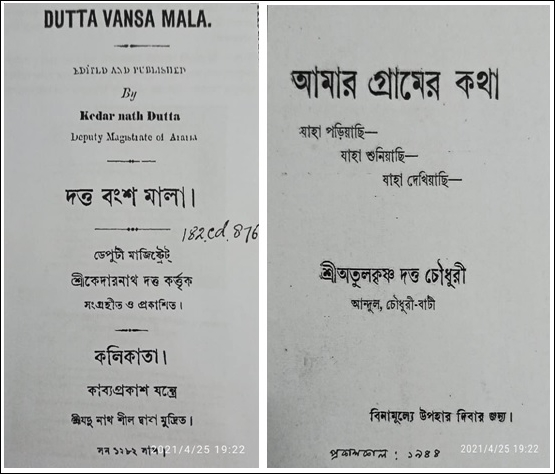
The two old books on the history of the family, Andul - Dutta Vansa Mala (1876 CE) and Amar Gramer Kotha (1944 CE), in Bengali language.

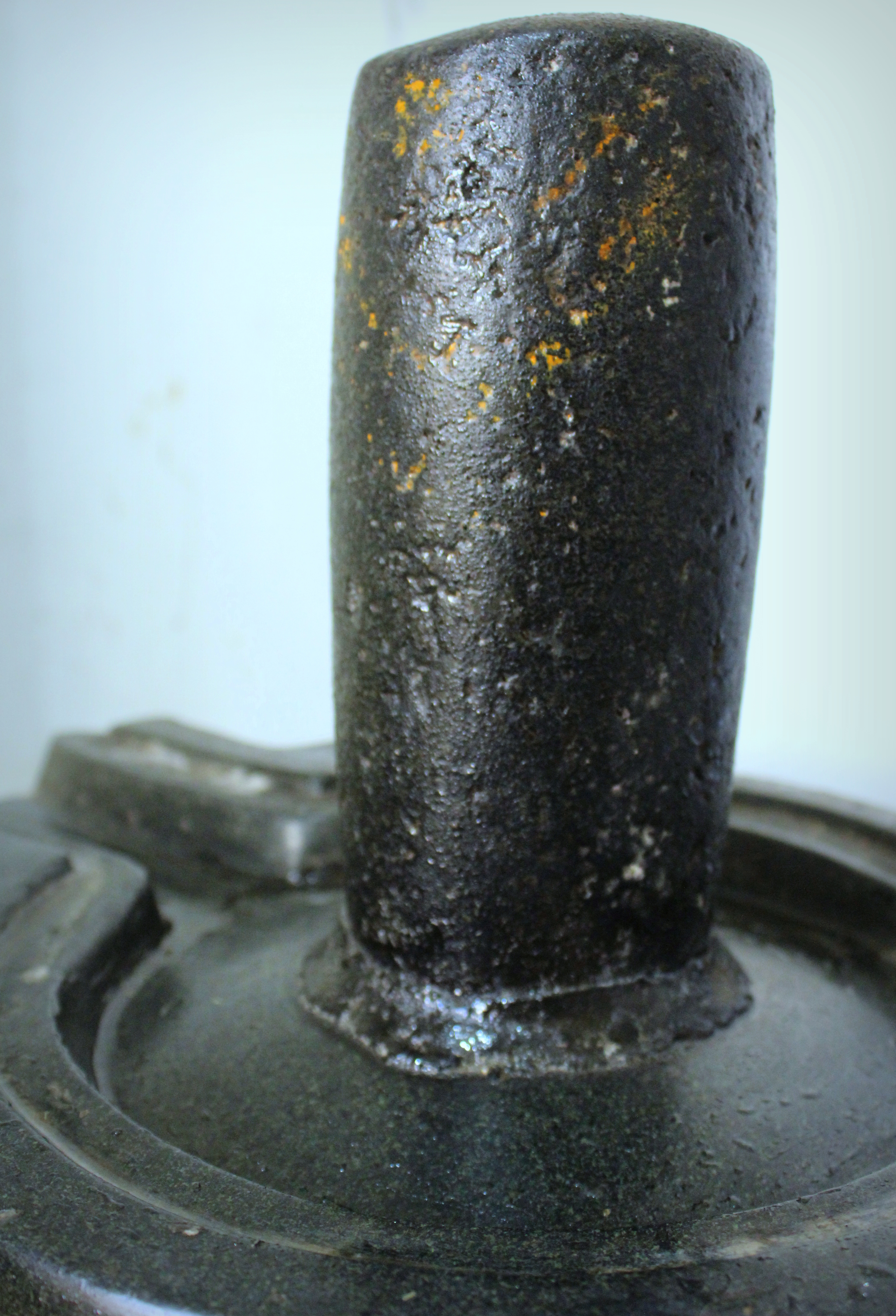
Kashiswar Jiu - the age-old ancestral deity of the family, installed by Kashiswar Dutta Chowdhury in mid-17th century CE.

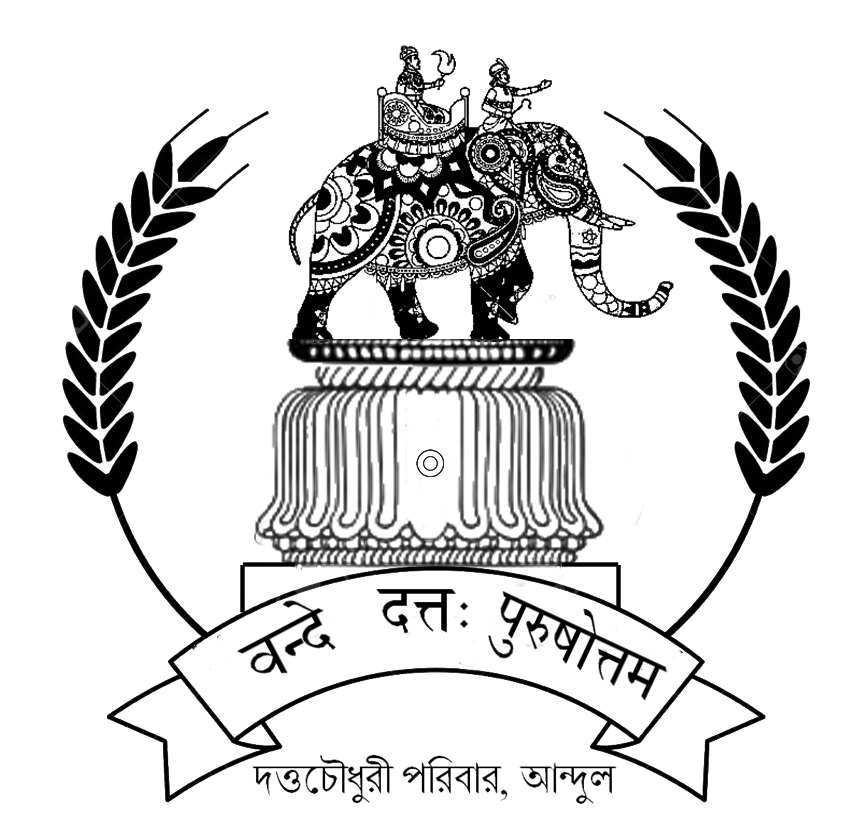
Original and registered emblem of the Chowdhury family.

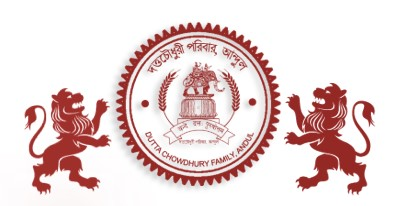
Seal used in Debottur Estate

Dhruba Dutta Chaudhury hailing from Shri Purushottam Dutta of Dutta Chaudhury Family of Andul, Howrah

== Dutta Chowdhury clan at Hatkhola ==
Kolkata-based Hatkhola Dutta family is a branch of the Chowdhury family.

== Books ==
1. Dutta Chaudhuri Chronicles - Our Ancestry, 2020, By Hemotpaul Chaudhuri.ISBN 979-8616610058
2. Chowdhury Bongsher Itibritto, 2020,By Dhruba Dutta Chaudhury. Blue Rose Publishers, New Delhi, ISBN 978-9390380893 of ROC no. L-97526/2020 dated 11 Dec 2020 vide Copy Right office, Government of India.
