= Mahiari =

- Census Town
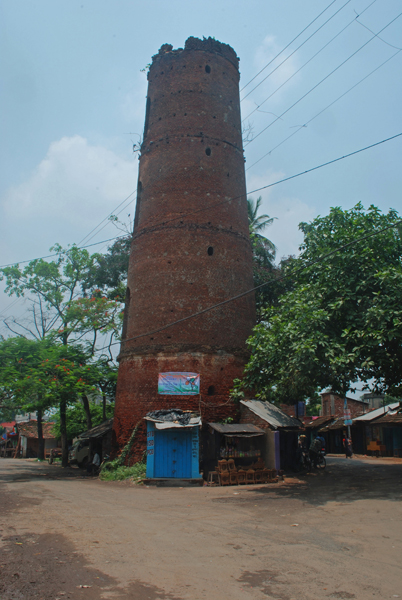
- Abandoned Semaphore Tower at Khatir Bazar, Mahiari

- Location in West Bengal, India Mahiari (India)
- Coordinates: 22.59°N 88.24°E
- Country: India
- State: West Bengal
- District: Howrah
- Elevation: 6 m (20 ft)

Population (2011)
  - Total: 18,223

Languages
  - Official: Bengali, English
- Time zone: UTC+5:30 (IST)
- PIN: 711302
- Vehicle registration: WB
- Lok Sabha constituency: Howrah
- Vidhan Sabha constituency: Sankrail
- Website: howrah.gov.in

Mahiari is a census town in Domjur CD Block of Howrah Sadar subdivision in Howrah district in the Indian state of West Bengal.

== Geography ==
Acharya Sirish Sarani (Khatir Bazar Road) at Girjatala, Mahiari

Mahiari is located at 22.59°N 88.24°E. Sankrail is located about 3 km south of Mahiari. Mourigram and Santragachi are on its east side. Kolkata lies within 15 km from Mahiari. It has an average elevation of 6 m (20 ft).

Mahiari is adjacent to Andul and the two together are referred to as Andul–Mouri (also spelt Andul–Mowri). PIN for Andul–Mouri is 711302 and for Andul Road is 711103.

== Demographics ==
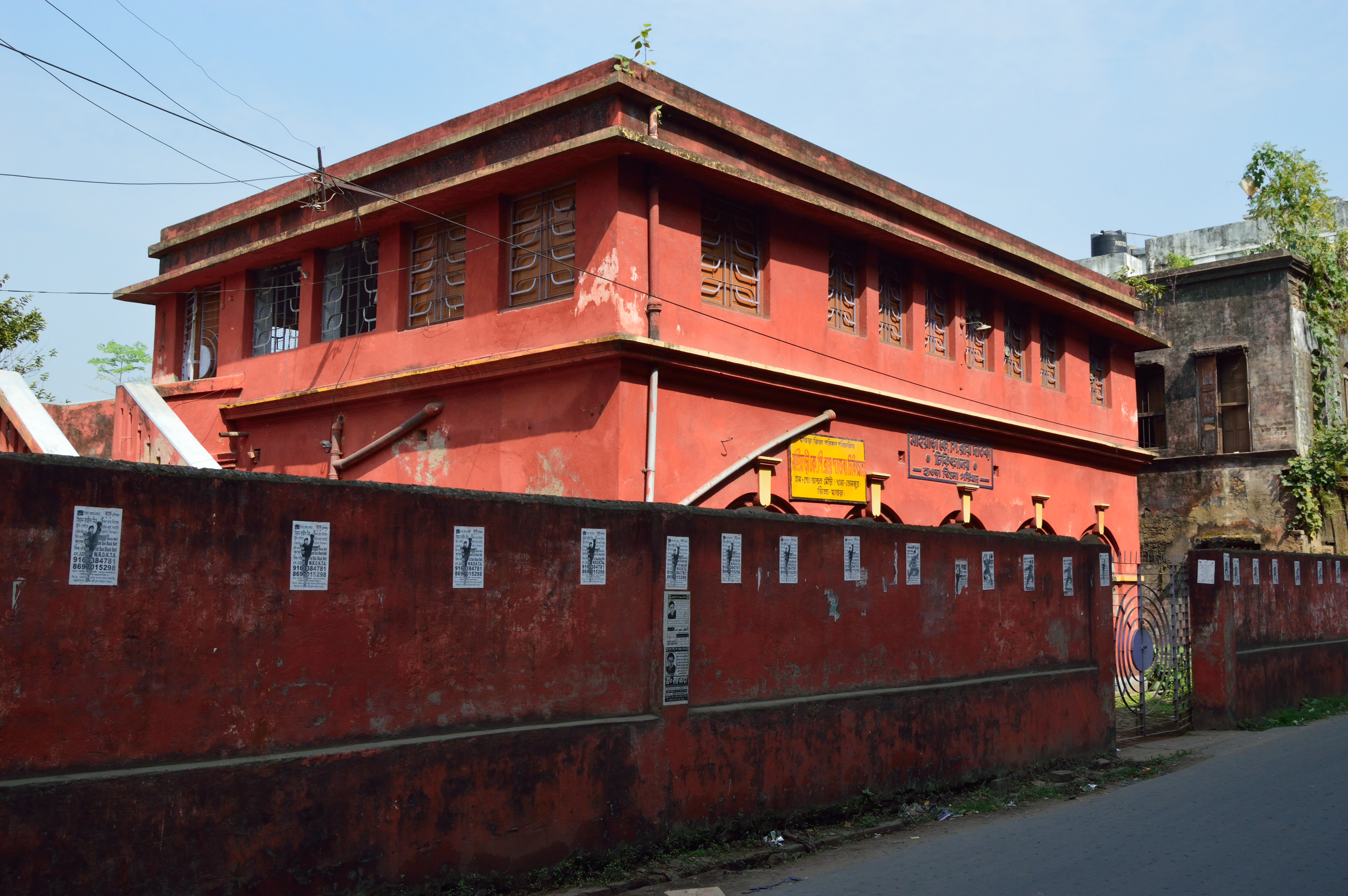
P K Roy Charitable Health Centre, Mahiari

As per 2011 Census of India Mahiari had a total population of 18,223 of which 9,209 (51%) were males and 9,014 (49%) were females. Population below 6 years was 1,634. The total number of literates in Mahiari was 15,055 (90.75% of the population over 6 years).

Mahiari was part of Kolkata Urban Agglomeration in 2011 census.

As of 2001 India census, Mahiari had a population of 15,422. Males constitute 51% of the population and females 49%. Mahiari has an average literacy rate of 77%, higher than the national average of 59.5%: male literacy is 81% and female literacy is 73%. In Mahiari, 10% of the population is under 6 years of age.

== Culture ==
Radha-Krishna and Jagannath-Shiva Mandirs at Chanpiritala, Mahiari

The Shiva temples, named Panchananda and Sasaneswar, established by the Kundu Choudhury family, are more than a century old.

There is a 165 feet (50 m) high semaphore telegraphy tower at Khatir Bazar.

== Economy ==
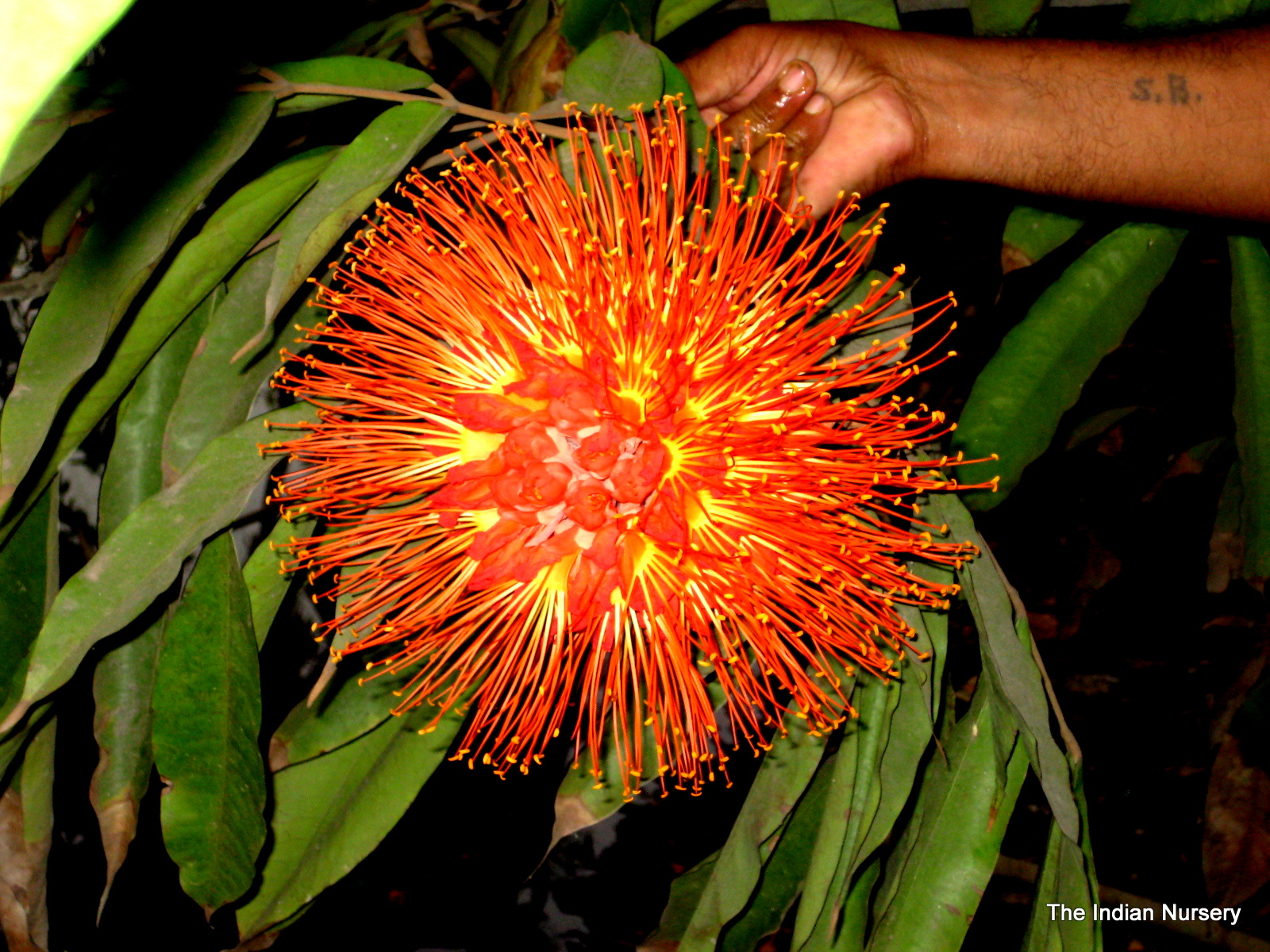
Brownea grandiceps at The Indian Nursery

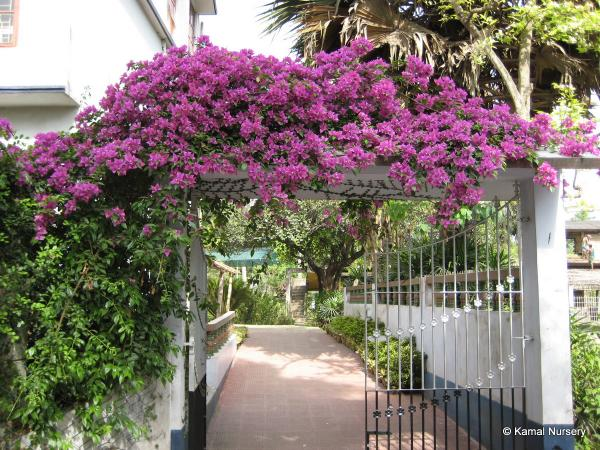
Bougainvillea gate at Kamal Nursery

Mahiari houses several industrial activity especially in the northern areas near Alampur. Leading industries are steel, engineering and instrumentation, motor vehicle, jewellery, dairy etc. Previously there was a large operation of Frigerio Conserva Allana Ltd at the southern part near Mourigram railway station. "Kamal Nursery" and "The Indian Nursery" two of the most famous names in the Indian horticulture industry are situated at Mahiari. Howrah Flower Growers' Association organize flower exhibition at Kamal Nursery every year. There are a number of markets including that of Mouri Bazar and Khatir Bazar. Mahiari has its renowned traditional industry of wooden furniture that caters clients from all over Kolkata and Howrah.

== Transport ==
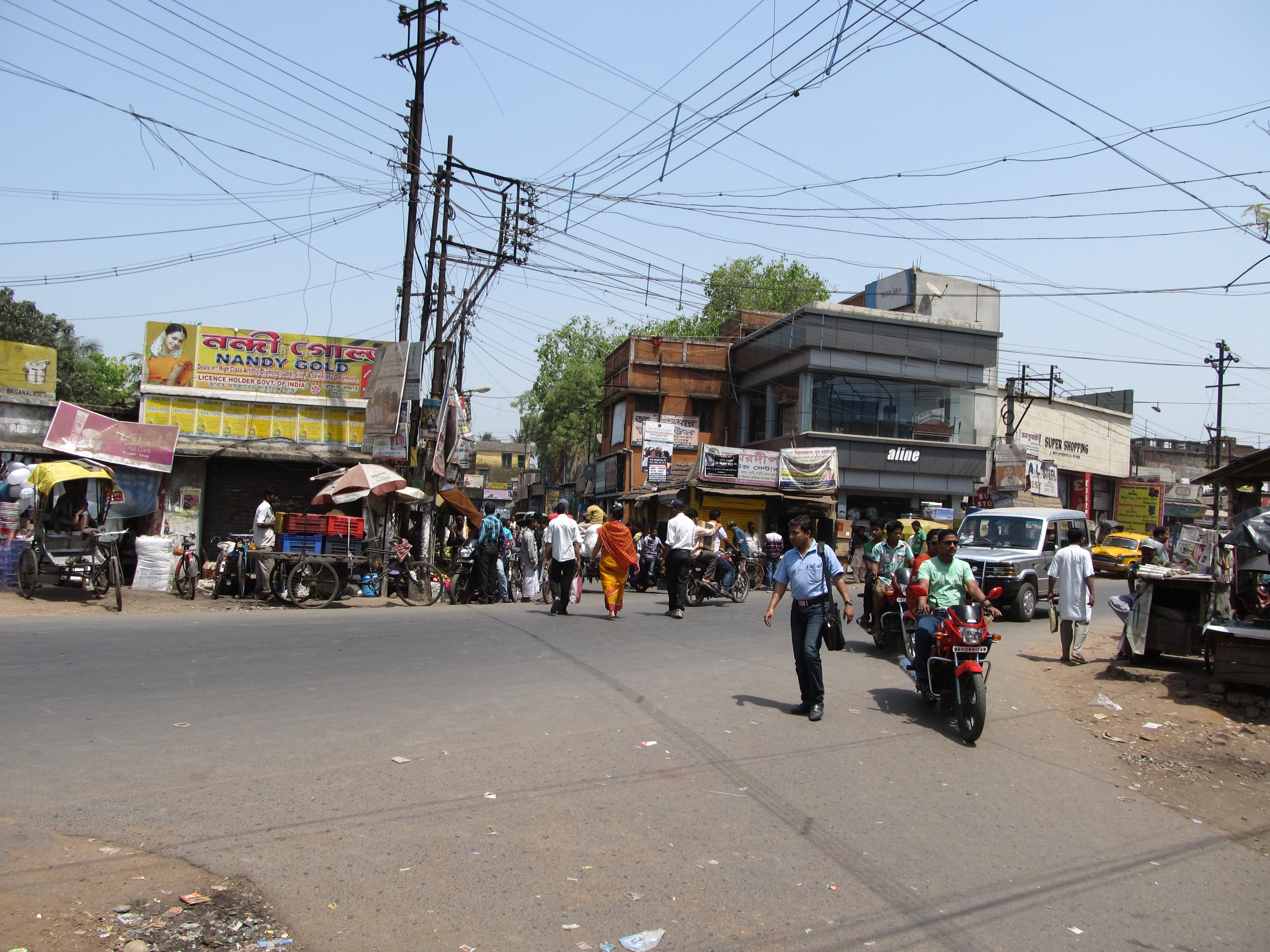
Andul Road

Andul Road (part of Grand Trunk Road/State Highway 6) is the artery of the town.

=== Bus ===
==== Private Bus ====
- 61 Alampur - Howrah Station

==== Mini Bus ====
- 13 Ranihati - Rajabazar
- 13A Fatikgachi - Rajabazar
- 20 Alampur - Ultadanga Station

==== Bus Routes Without Numbers ====
- Mourigram railway station - Barrackpur Cantonment
- Andul railway station - New Town Ecospace

=== Train ===
Andul railway station and Mourigram railway station on Howrah-Kharagpur line are the nearest railway stations. Howrah Station is about 10 km from here.

=== Airport ===
Netaji Subhash Chandra Bose International Airport in Dumdum, Kolkata is about 25 km from here.
