= Argari =

- Census Town
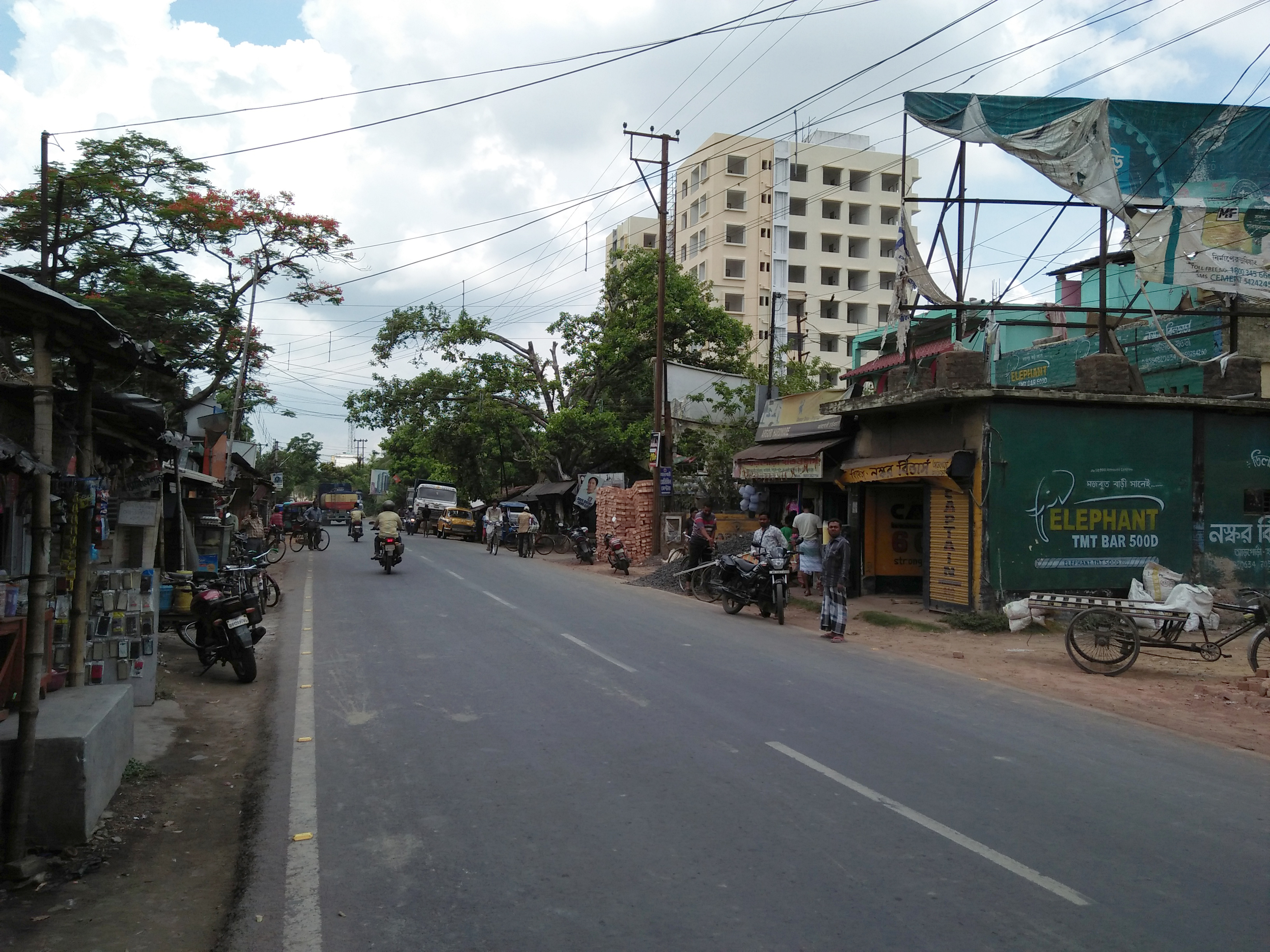
- Andul Road (part of SH 6), Argari

- Location in West Bengal, India Argari (India)
- Coordinates: 22.58°N 88.22°E
- Country: India
- State: West Bengal
- District: Howrah

Population (2011)
  - Total: 10,715

Languages
  - Official: Bengali, English
- Time zone: UTC+5:30 (IST)
- Vehicle registration: WB
- Lok Sabha constituency: Howrah
- Vidhan Sabha constituency: Sankrail
- Website: howrah.gov.in

Argari is a census town in Sankrail CD Block of Howrah Sadar subdivision in Howrah district in the Indian state of West Bengal.

== Geography ==
Argari is located at 22°35′15″N 88°13′34″E. It is situated between Andul and Alampur.

== Demographics ==
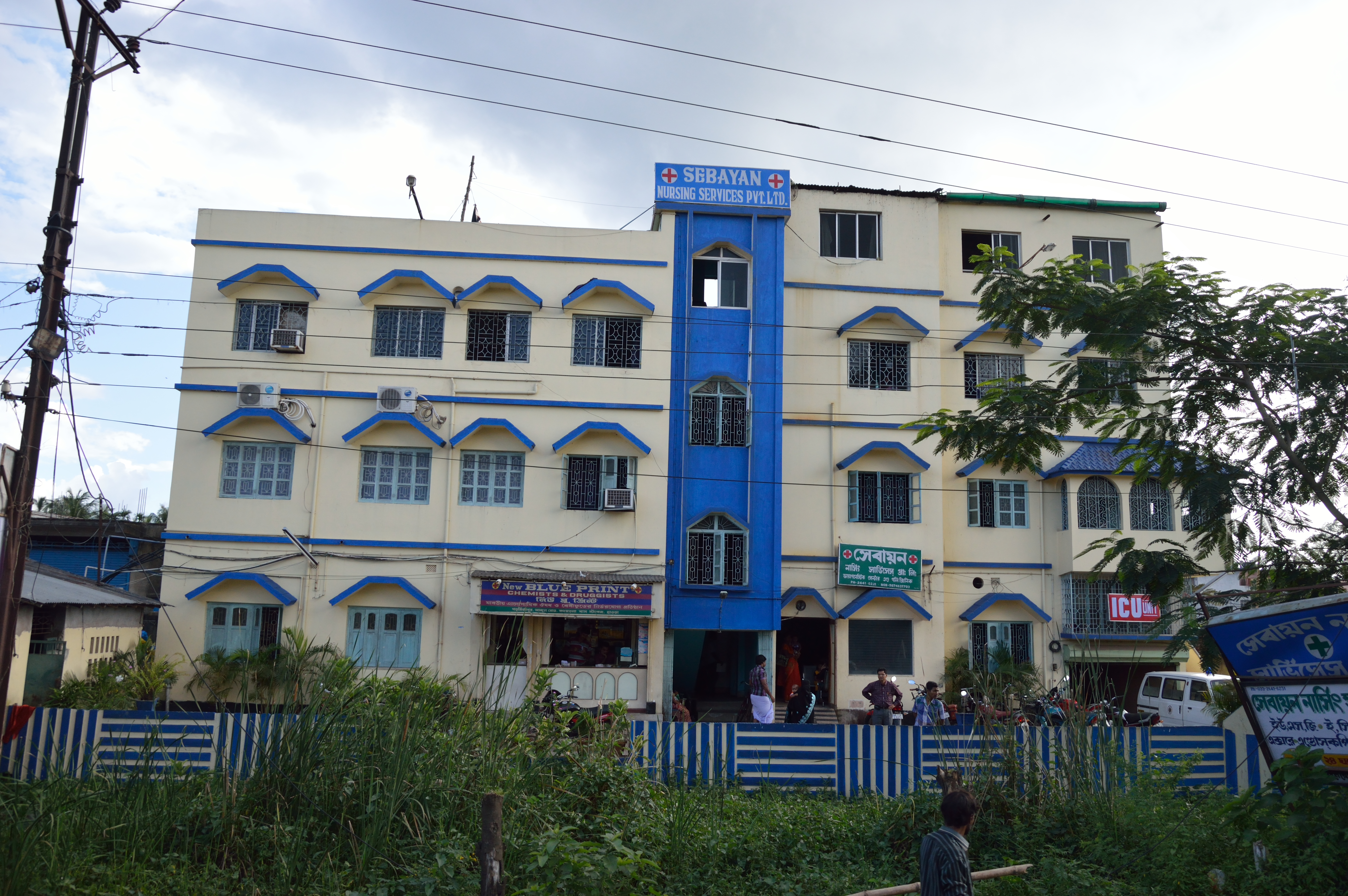
Sebayan Nursing Home, Andul Road, Argari

As per 2011 Census of India Argari had a total population of 10,715 of which 5,555 (52%) were males and 5,160 (48%) were females. Population below 6 years was 1,217. The total number of literates in Argari was 8,156 (85.87% of the population over 6 years).

Argari was part of Kolkata Urban Agglomeration in 2011 census.

As of 2001 India census, Argari had a population of 9525. Males constitute 52% of the population and females 48%. Argari has an average literacy rate of 66%, higher than the national average of 59.5%; with 54% of the males and 46% of females literate. 13% of the population is under 6 years of age.

== Transport ==
Andul Road (part of Grand Trunk Road/State Highway 6) is the artery of the town.

=== Bus ===
==== Private Bus ====
- 61 Alampur - Howrah Station

==== Mini Bus ====
- 13 Ranihati - Rajabazar
- 13A Fatikgachi - Rajabazar
- 20 Alampur - Ultadanga Station

==== Bus Routes Without Numbers ====
- Mourigram railway station - Barrackpur Cantonment

=== Train ===
Andul railway station and Mourigram railway station on Howrah-Kharagpur line are the nearest railway stations of Argari.

== Climate ==
Climate data for Bagati (1991–2020 normals, extremes 1971–2007)
Month	Jan	Feb	Mar	Apr	May	Jun	Jul	Aug	Sep	Oct	Nov	Dec	Year
Record high °C (°F)	33.3 (91.9)	36.8 (98.2)	39.8 (103.6)	44.5 (112.1)	45.5 (113.9)	46.2 (115.2)	39.3 (102.7)	37.3 (99.1)	37.9 (100.2)	38.4 (101.1)	38.5 (101.3)	36.5 (97.7)	46.2 (115.2)
Mean daily maximum °C (°F)	23.8 (74.8)	27.6 (81.7)	32.2 (90.0)	34.9 (94.8)	35.2 (95.4)	33.4 (92.1)	31.7 (89.1)	31.6 (88.9)	31.6 (88.9)	31.2 (88.2)	28.9 (84.0)	25.2 (77.4)	30.6 (87.1)
Mean daily minimum °C (°F)	12.6 (54.7)	16.4 (61.5)	20.9 (69.6)	24.5 (76.1)	25.5 (77.9)	26.3 (79.3)	26.2 (79.2)	26.3 (79.3)	26.0 (78.8)	24.0 (75.2)	18.9 (66.0)	13.9 (57.0)	21.7 (71.1)
Record low °C (°F)	0.8 (33.4)	5.5 (41.9)	11.0 (51.8)	15.1 (59.2)	14.5 (58.1)	14.2 (57.6)	19.1 (66.4)	20.8 (69.4)	16.7 (62.1)	16.6 (61.9)	10.0 (50.0)	6.4 (43.5)	0.8 (33.4)
Average rainfall mm (inches)	15.0 (0.59)	23.1 (0.91)	38.2 (1.50)	50.2 (1.98)	130.5 (5.14)	257.4 (10.13)	320.9 (12.63)	273.8 (10.78)	247.7 (9.75)	126.1 (4.96)	21.5 (0.85)	4.6 (0.18)	1,509.1 (59.41)
Average rainy days	1.2	1.4	2.3	3.2	6.7	11.6	15.5	14.0	11.6	5.5	0.8	0.4	74.2
Average relative humidity (%) (at 17:30 IST)	62	58	60	65	67	77	82	82	82	78	69	64	70
Source: India Meteorological Department
