= Akshay Chandra Chaudhury =

Bengali Indian Poet

- অক্ষয় চন্দ্র চৌধুরী
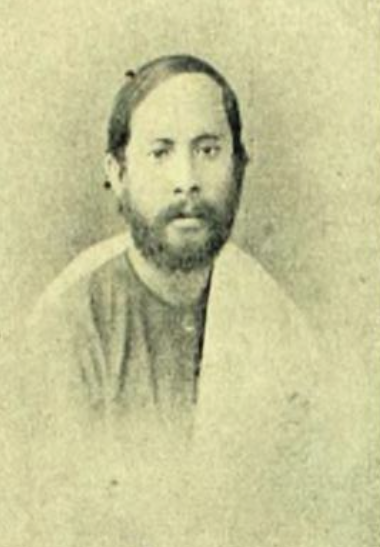
- Born: 7 September 1850; Calcutta (Kolkata), India
- Died: 5 September 1898 (aged 47)
- Education: M.A. from Presidency College, Kolkata
- Occupation: Poet
- Father: Mihir Chandra Chaudhury
- Relatives: Basanta Chaudhury, Kedarnath Dutta, Bimala Prasad Dutta, Prabhavati Dutta and Hatkhola Dutta family.
- Family: The zamindar Dutta Chaudhury family of Andul.
- Website: duttachaudhurichronicles.com

Akshay Chandra Chaudhury (7 September 1850 – 5 September 1898) was an Indian poet and novel writer, who reshaped Bengali literature and music.

== Early life and education ==
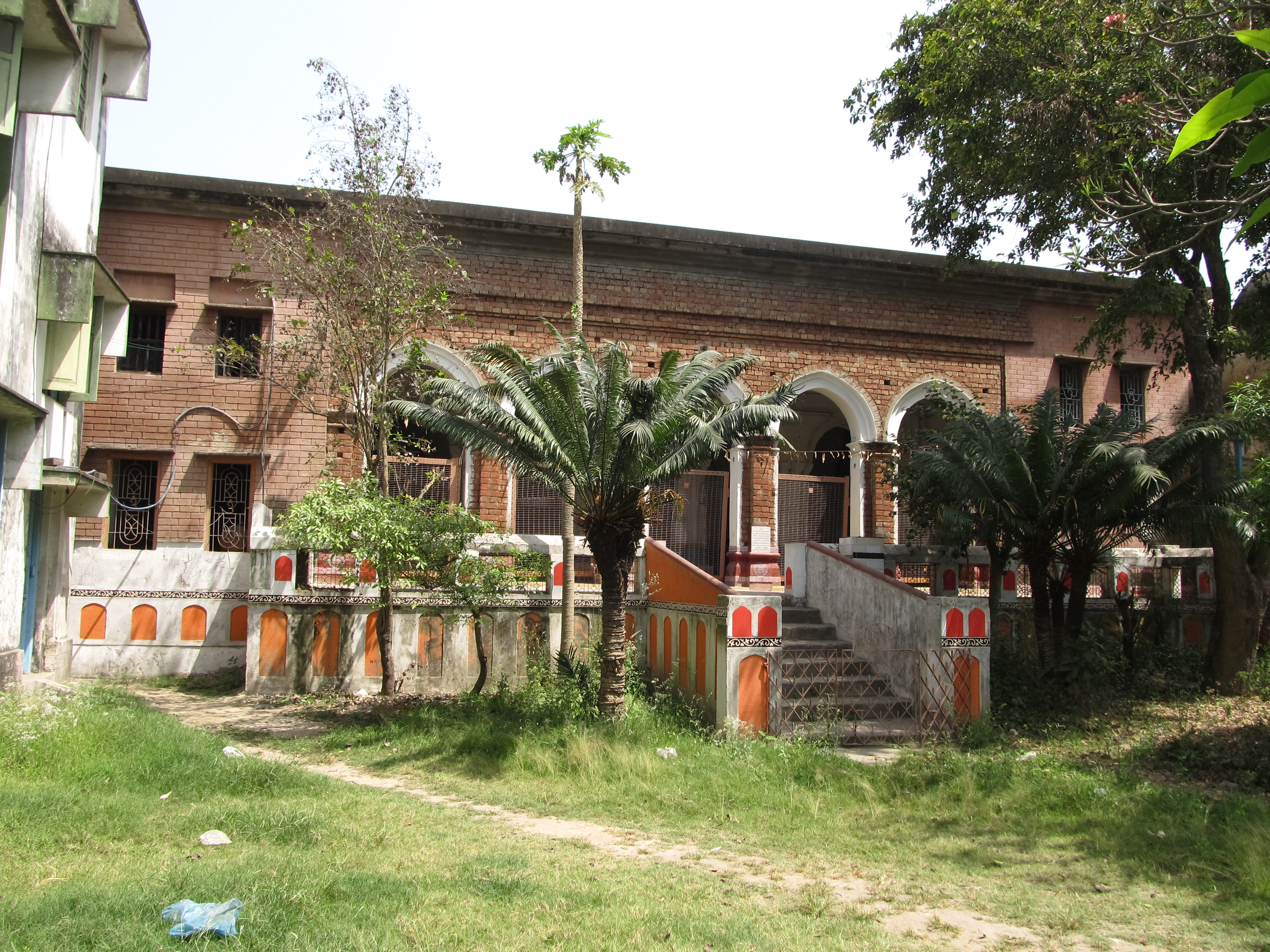
The age old Chandi-Mandap of Akshay Chandra's ancestral family in Andul.

Akshay Chandra Chowdhury was born in the affluent Chowdhury family of Andul, belonging to Bharadvaja clan. He was the youngest son of Mihir Chandra Chowdhury. He had earned his M.A. degree in English literature from Presidency College of Calcutta. He was a lawyer by profession.

== Major works ==
Akshay was a noted contributor to the Bharati newspaper and also editor for some time. His first poem, Bharat, was published in 1868. His long poem, Bharat Gatha, narrating the history of India from ancient times up to Sepoy Mutiny, was published in 1895. However, his longest poem Udasini, published in 1875, earned him considerable recognition and praise.

Akshay was married to Sarat Kumari (Basu) Chowdhurani, who was also a poet and journalist.

== Connection with the Tagore family ==
Akshay was Jyotirindranath Tagore's classmate in Hindu School. Jyotirindranath was the elder brother of Rabindranath Tagore.

Rabindranath loved to discuss high level literature with Akshay. Both Akshay and his wife participated in literary discussions that were held in a garden of the Thakur Bari; the garden was later named Nandan Kanan by Akshay.

Rabindranath Tagore referred to help received from Akshay in his own book titled My Reminiscences.
