= Mourigram =

Mourigram Maurigram
- Village
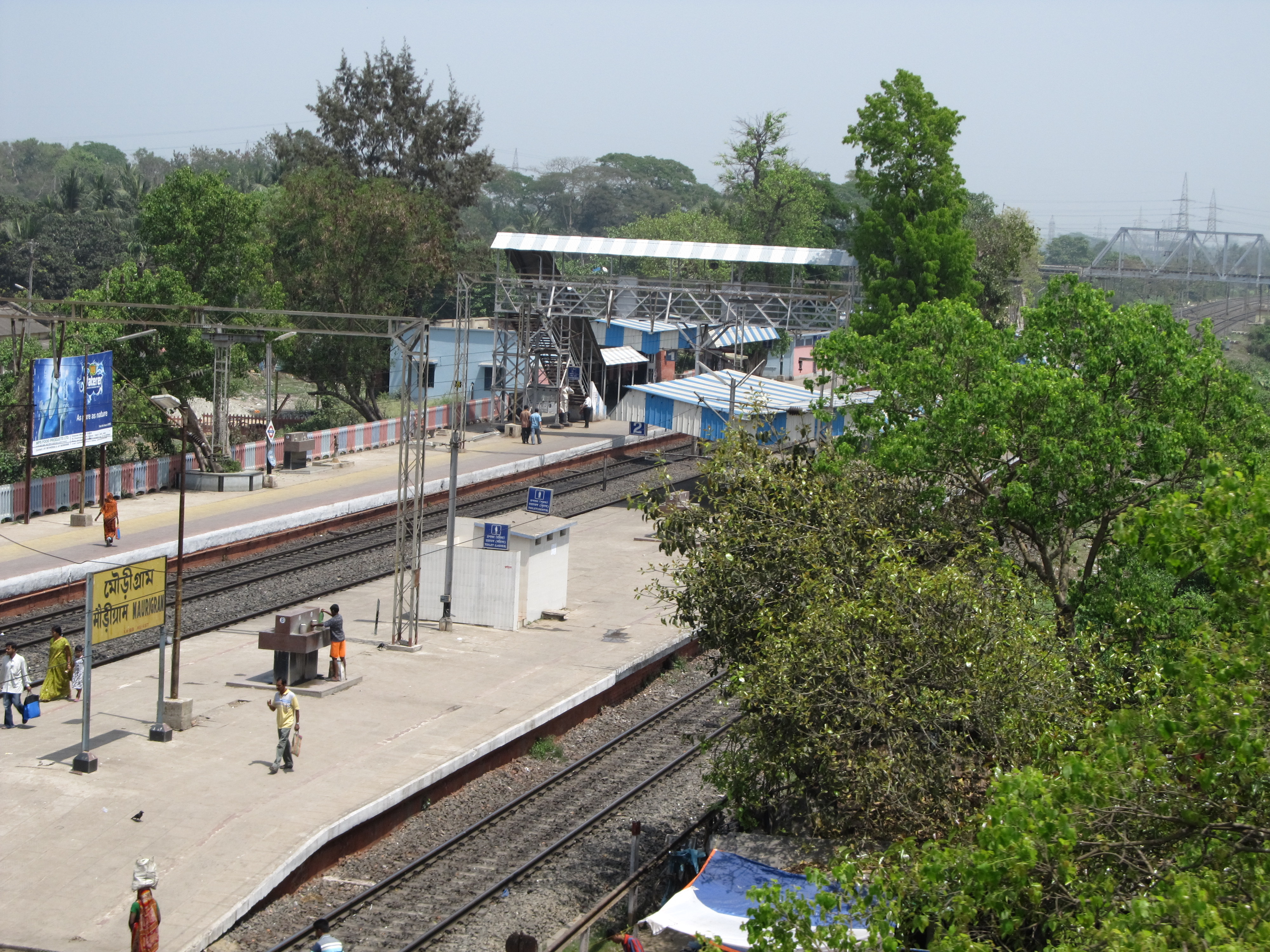
- Mourigram railway station
- Nickname: Mouri
- Country: India
- State: West Bengal
- District: Howrah

Languages
  - Official: Bengali, English
- Time zone: UTC+5:30 (IST)
- PIN: 711302, 711317
- Vehicle registration: WB
- Lok Sabha constituency: Howrah
- Vidhan Sabha constituency: Howrah Dakshin

Mourigram (also known as Maurigram) is a village in Sankrail CD Block of Howrah Sadar subdivision in Howrah district in the Indian state of West Bengal.

== Location ==
Mourigram is located between Podrah and Andul. Dhuilya is also adjacent to Mourigram.

== Culture and Education ==
Mourigram is well-known to all for Indian Oil Corporation Limited. Beside this, also there are very few industries at Mourigram. The locality is somewhat economically stable but is deprived of its primary needs for development. Most people are educated and gentle. Most of them are businessman or Government Employees. There are few schools: Nimtala high school, Maria's day school, Oxford high school, St. Thomas school and a Law college. The nearest college is Prabhu Jagatbandhu College, which is affiliated to University of Calcutta. Mourigram is near to Garden Reach Shipbuilders & Engineers (GRSE), with a ferry service connecting Nazirgunj (near Mourigram) to GRSE's Metiabruz office.

== Transport ==
Mourigram has a good connectivity to Kolkata which is 12 km by road and is 14 km from Howrah Station. Andul Road (part of Grand Trunk Road/State Highway 6) is the artery of the town. Mourigram Rail Overbridge was constructed along Andul Road in 2004 to avoid traffic jam along railway tracks and to reduce accidents.

=== Bus ===
==== Private Bus ====
- 61 Alampur - Howrah Station

==== Mini Bus ====
- 13 Ranihati - Rajabazar
- 13A Fatikgachi - Rajabazar
- 20 Alampur - Ultadanga Station
- 20A Mourigram - Salt Lake Tank no. 13

==== Bus Routes Without Numbers ====
- Mourigram railway station - Barrackpur Cantonment
- Andul railway station - New Town Ecospace

=== Train ===
Mourigram railway station on Howrah-Kharagpur line serves the locality.
