= Narayana Multispeciality Hospital, Howrah =

Narayana Multispeciality Hospital, Howrah (formerly Westbank Hospital)
- Narayana Health
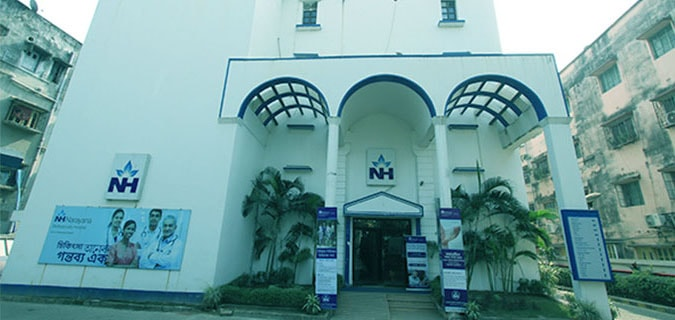
- Narayana Multispeciality Hospital, Howrah

Geography
- Location: Podrah, Near Chunabati, Andul Road, Howrah, West Bengal - 711109
- Coordinates: 22°34′2.8085″N 88°16′12.5810″E

Links
- Website: Official Website

Narayana Multispeciality Hospital (formerly known as Westbank Hospital), sister hospital of Narayana Superspeciality Hospital, Howrah, is a multi-speciality hospital of Narayana Health on Andul road, Howrah, West Bengal. Its proximity to Kolkata makes it accessible to patients from the metropolis. The hospital has 150 beds in unit 1 and 250 beds in unit 2.

The hospital was a subsidiary of Meridian Medical Research & Hospital Limited (MMRHL), a public limited company, which was acquired by the Narayana Health group, headed by renowned cardiac surgeon Dr. Devi Prasad Shetty in 2014. The hospital was initially operated by MMRHL for 15 years.
