= Narayana Superspeciality Hospital, Howrah =

Narayana Superspeciality Hospital
- Narayana Health
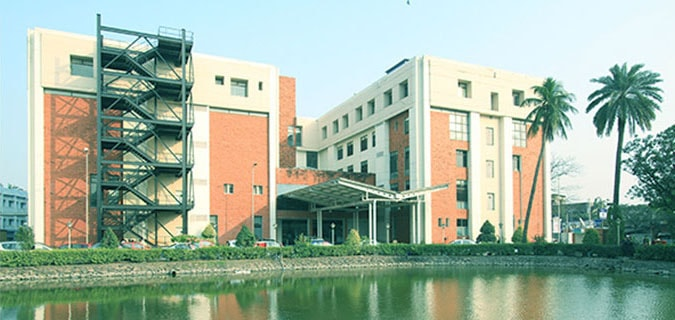

Geography
- Location: 120/1, Andul Rd, Near Nabanna, Howrah, West Bengal - 711103
- Coordinates: 22.56251°N 88.30808°E

Organisation
- Type: Multi Speciality

Services
- Emergency department: Yes (24x7)

Links
- Website: Official Website

Narayana Superspeciality Hospital is a superspecialty hospital located in Howrah, West Bengal. It is a unit of the Narayana Health group and treats patients from the cities of Howrah and Kolkata in West Bengal, India. Its sister hospital is Narayana Multispeciality Hospital, Howrah. The hospital, established by Dr. Devi Prasad Shetty, is a center for oncology and cardiac sciences in Eastern India. Its tertiary care services include cardiac surgery, neurology, neurosurgery, and orthopedics.

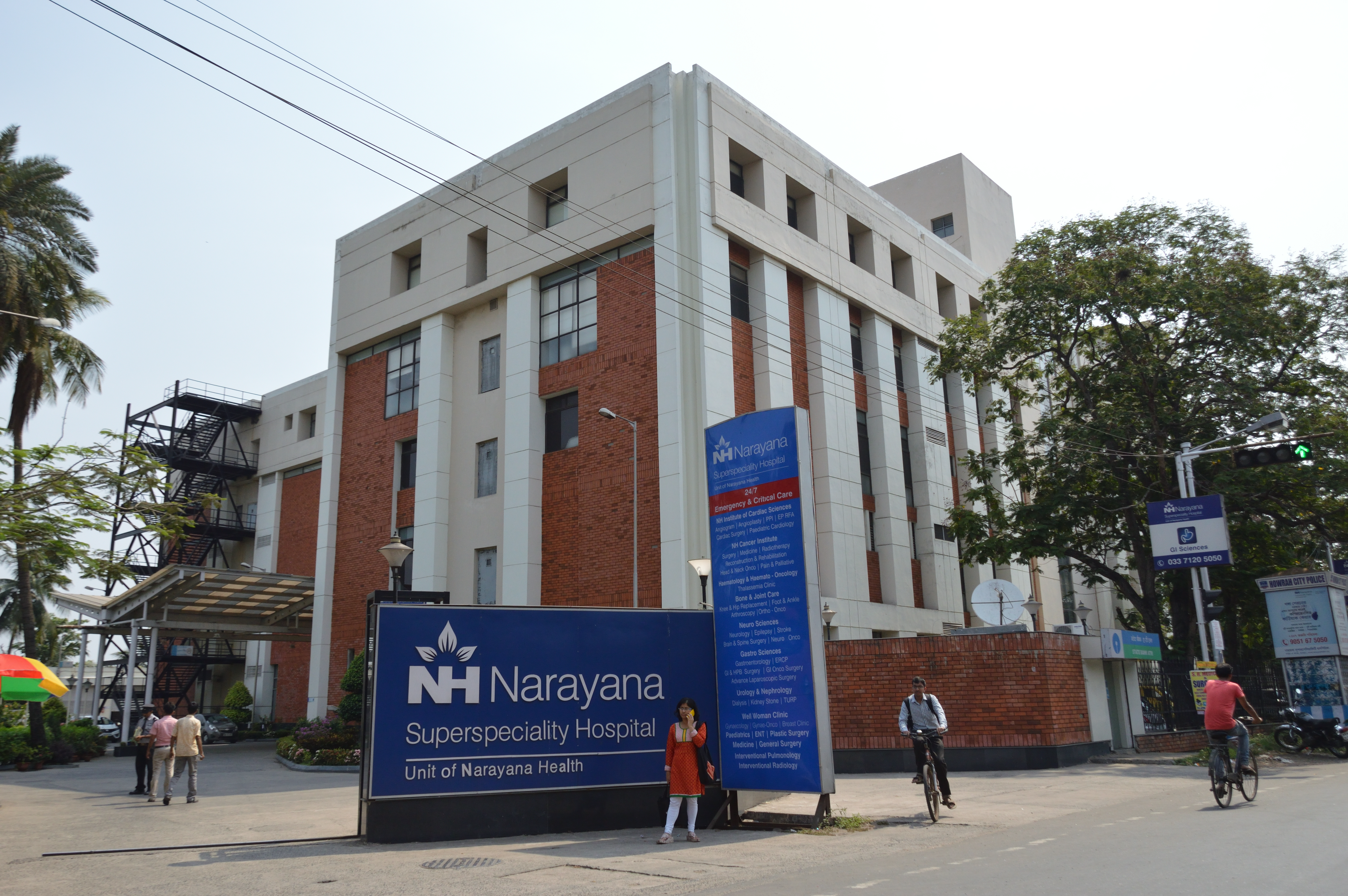
