= Andul rajbari =

Palace in Andul, West Bengal, India

Andul Rajbari
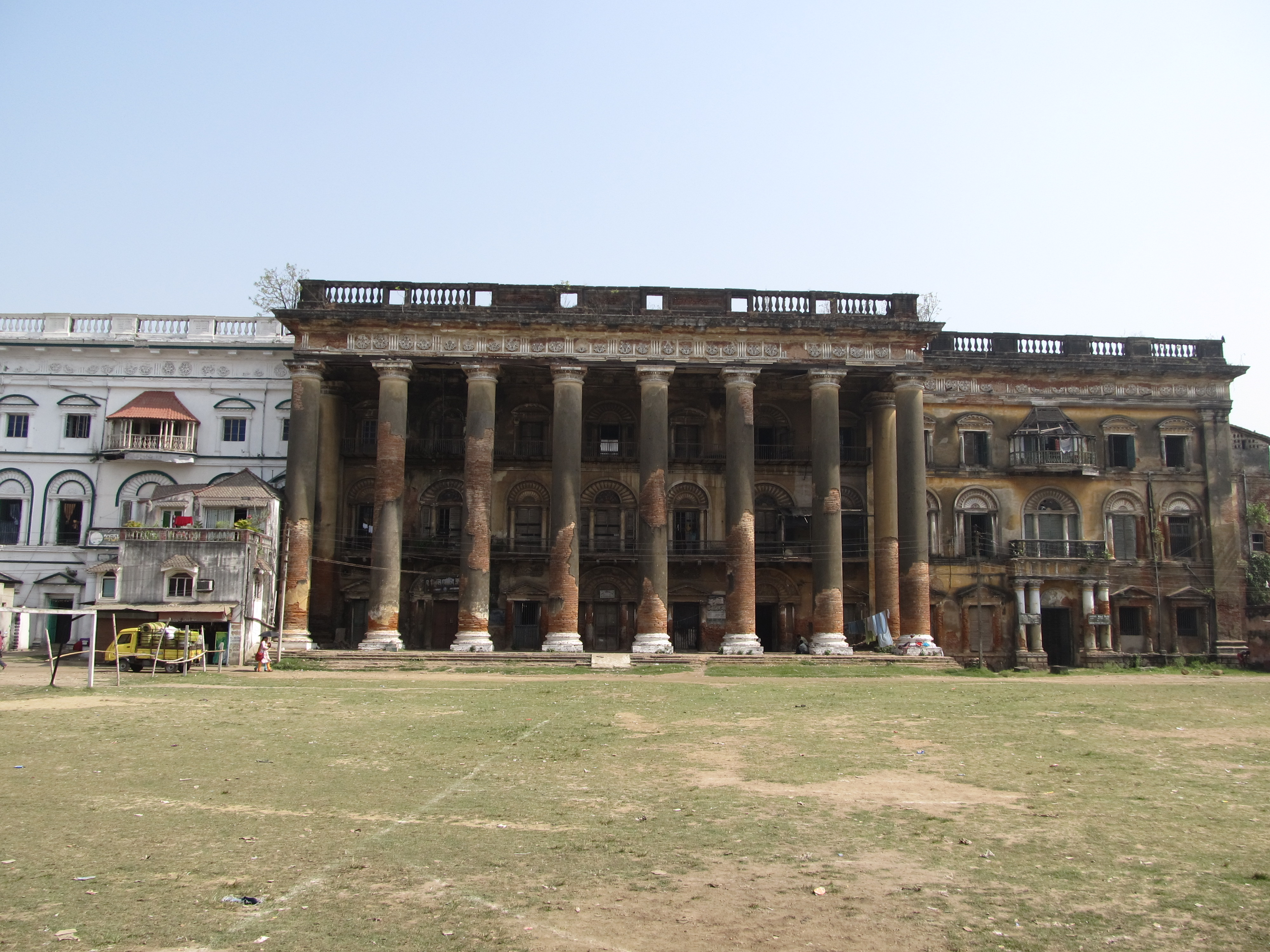
- Front façade of Andul Royal Palace
- Interactive map of the Andul Rajbari area

General information
- Location: Andul
- Coordinates: 22.5832°N 88.2356°E
- Completed: 1834

Andul Rajbari is a heritage palace situated at Andul, in Howrah district, West Bengal, India. The current residents of the Rajbari are the Mitra family and a local Girls' school.

== Geography ==
Andul (Bengali: আন্দুল; IAST: Āndula) is a census town in the Sankrail block under the Sadar sub-division in Howrah district in the Indian state of West Bengal. It is a local hub of commercial and industrial activity within and around Sankrail block.

== History ==
Raja Rajnarayan Bahadur built the palace during the period of 1830-34 and it was made by the Granville Macleod Company. 1962 film Sahib Bibi Aur Ghulam shooting was made in this palace.

== Andul Rajbari Gallery ==
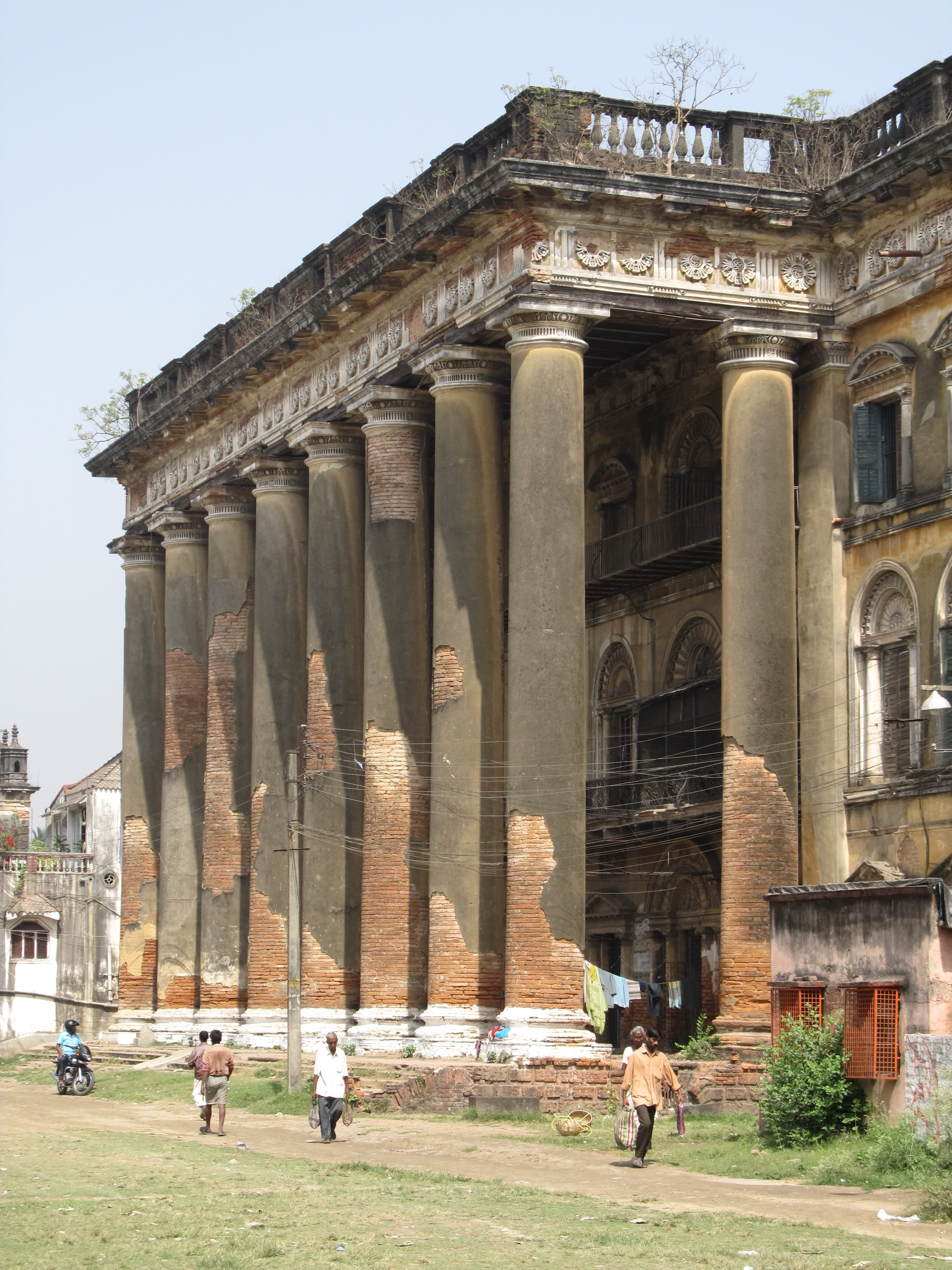
Close-up of the Facade

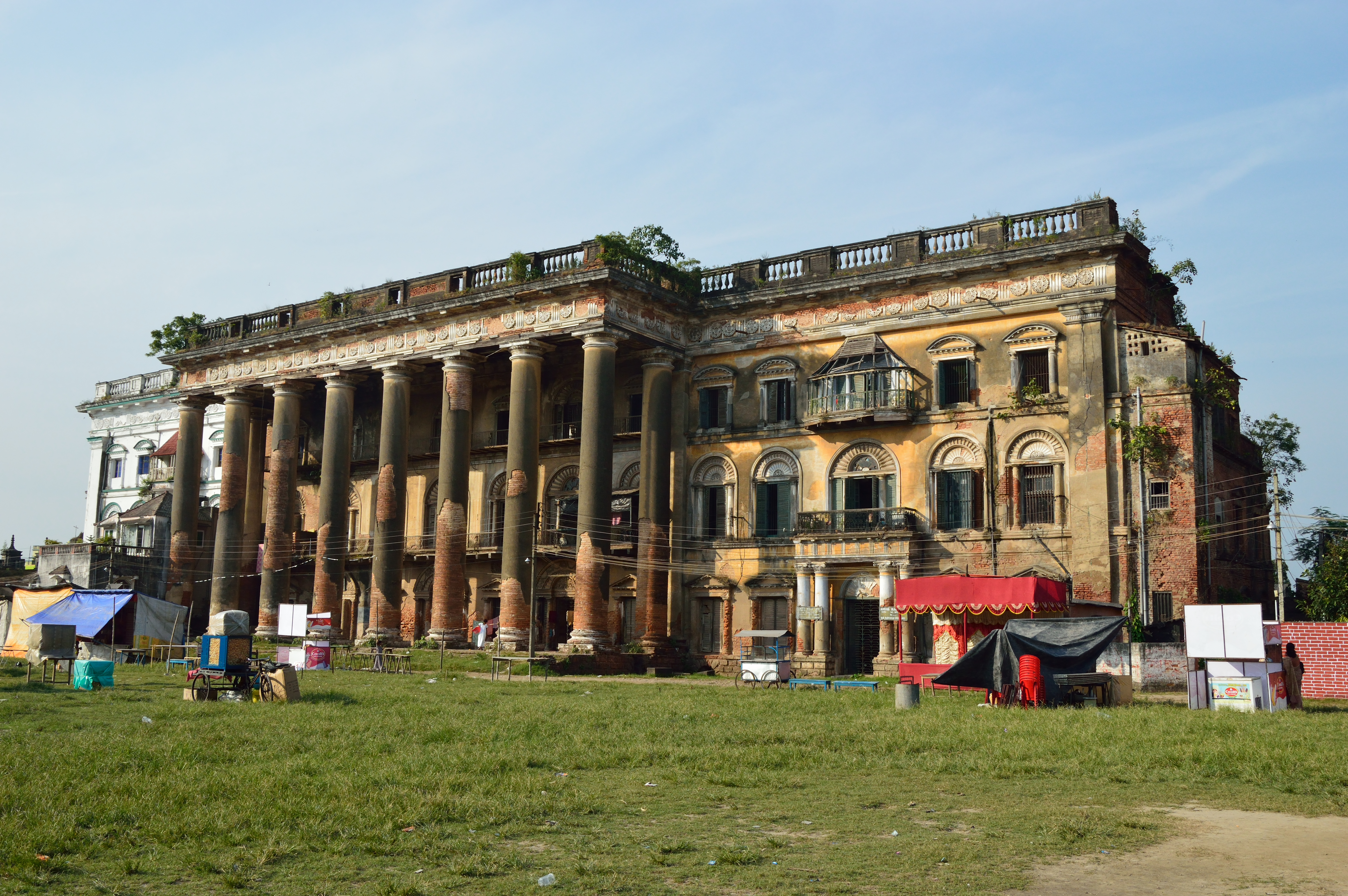
Andul Royal Palace

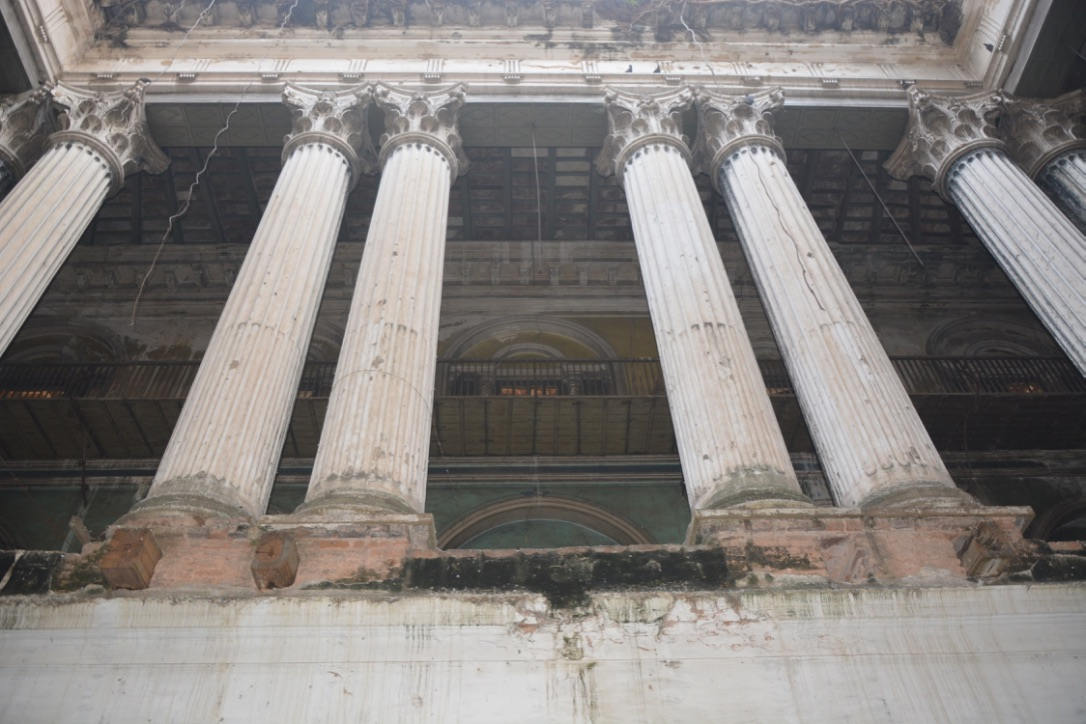
Andul Rajbari

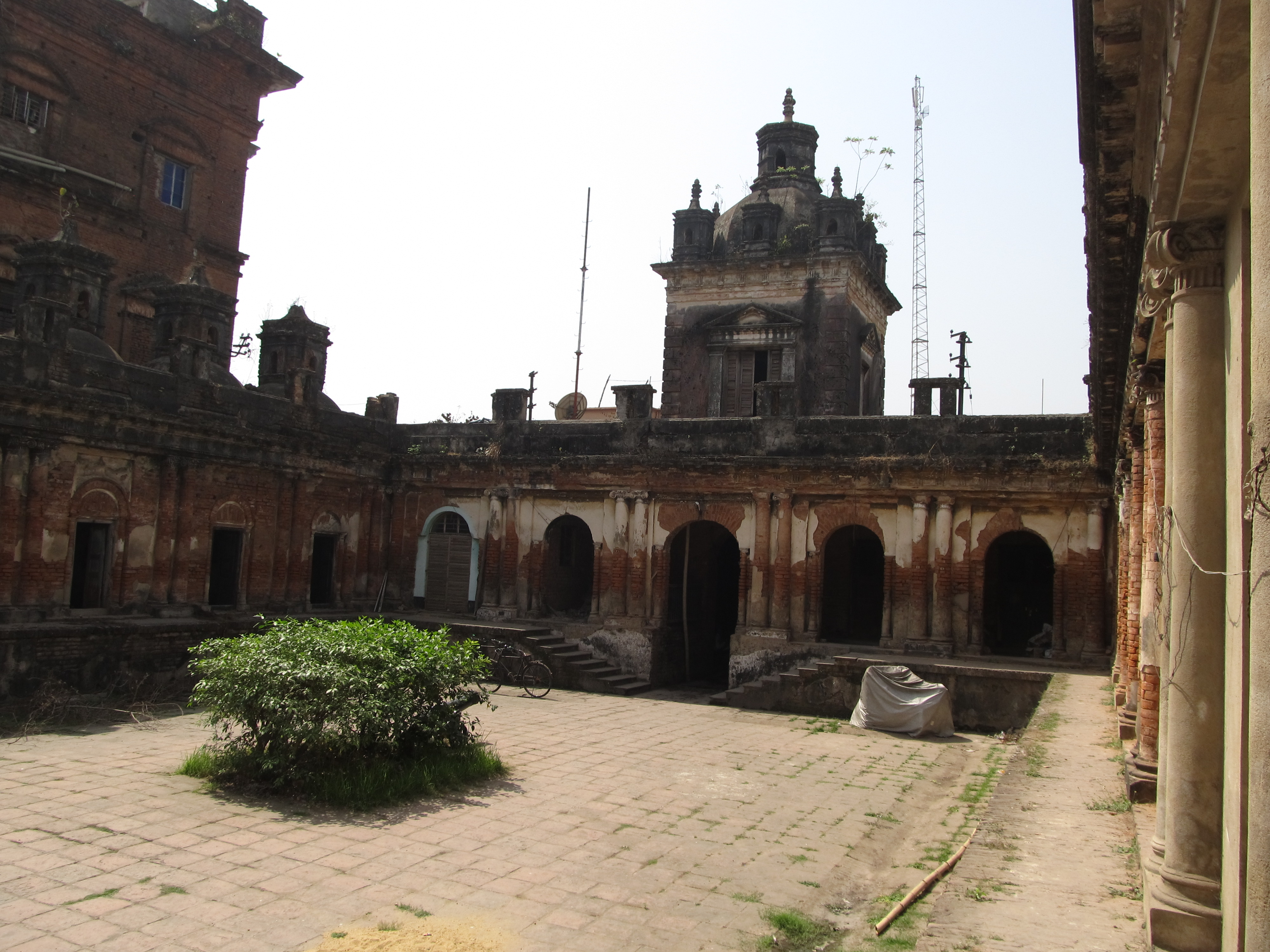
Annapurna & Fourteen Shiva Temples Complex, Andul Royal Palace
