= Andul =

- Census Town
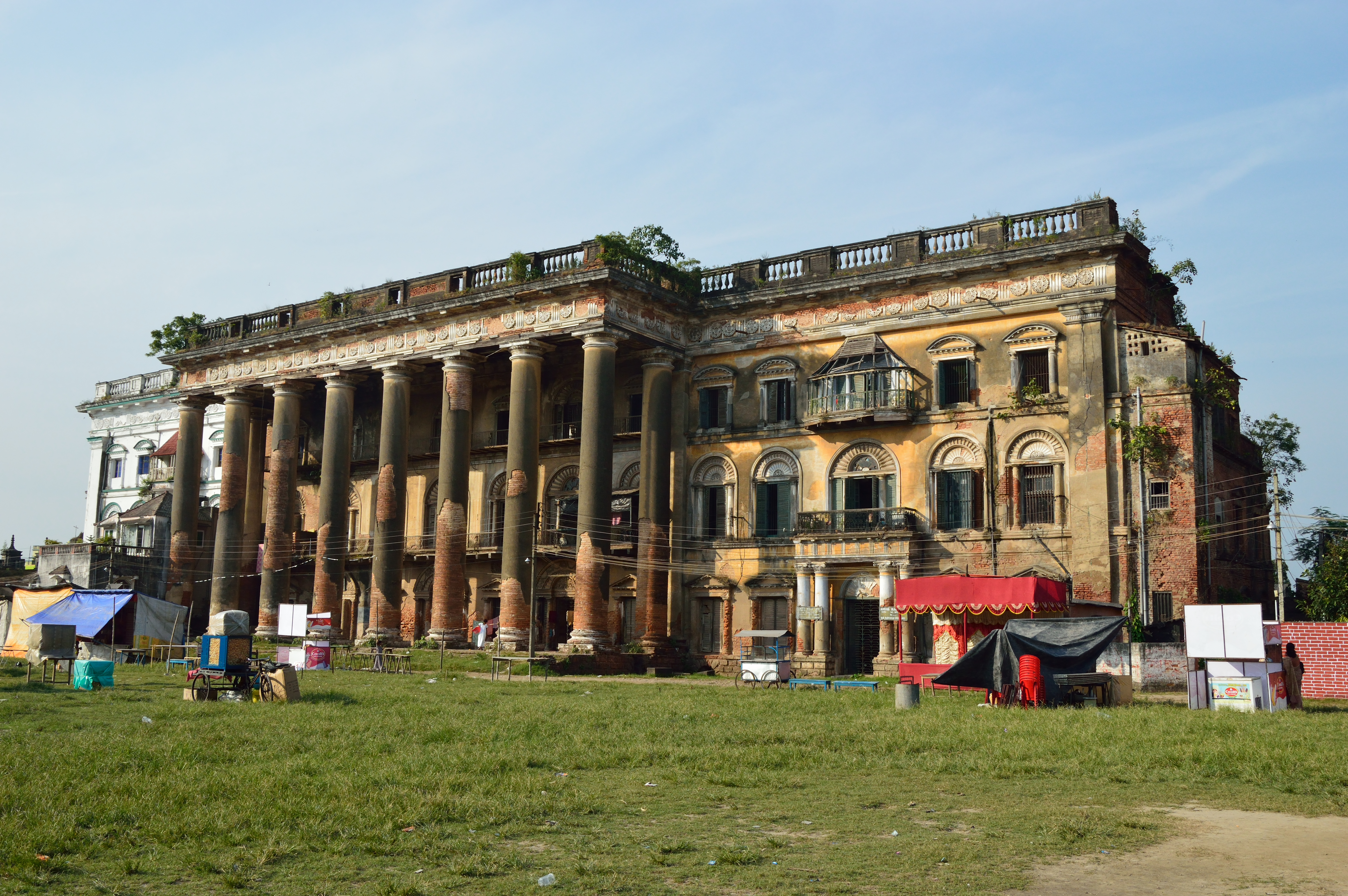
- Façade of the Andul rajbari

- Location in West Bengal, India Andul (India)
- Coordinates: 22.58°N 88.24°E
- Country: India
- State: West Bengal
- District: Howrah

Population (2011)
  - Total: 6,302

Languages
  - Official: Bengali, English
- Time zone: UTC+5:30 (IST)
- PIN: 711302
- Vehicle registration: WB
- Lok Sabha constituency: Howrah
- Vidhan Sabha constituency: Sankrail
- Website: howrah.gov.in

Kundu Chaudhury Mansion, Mahiari, Andul, Howrah

Andul is a census town in Sankrail CD Block of Howrah Sadar subdivision in Howrah district in the Indian state of West Bengal.

== Geography ==
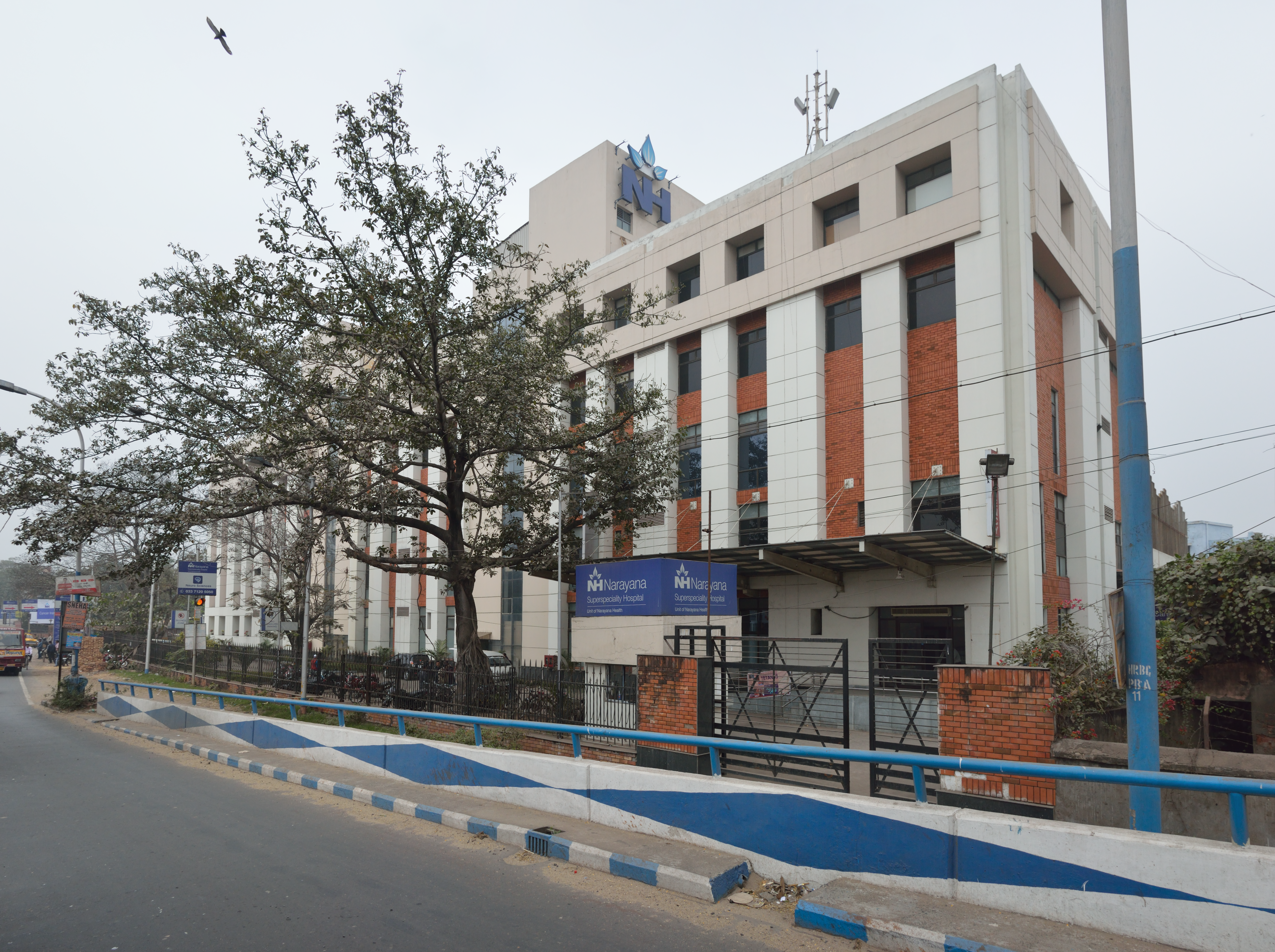
Narayana Superspeciality Hospital, Andul Road, Howrah

Area of Andul is 17.98 km². Andul is located at 22.58°N 88.24°E. It is situated between Mourigram and Argari.

== Demographics ==
As per 2011 Census of India Andul had a total population of 6,302 of which 3,182 (50%) were males and 3,120 (50%) were females. Population below 6 years was 397. The total number of literates in Andul was 5,626 (95.28% of the population over 6 years).

Andul was part of Kolkata Urban Agglomeration in 2011 census.

As of 2001 India census, Andul had a population of 5677. Males constitute 51% of the population and females 49%. Andul has an average literacy rate of 87%, higher than the national average of 59.5%; with 53% of the males and 47% of females literate. 6% of the population is under 6 years of age.

== Economy ==
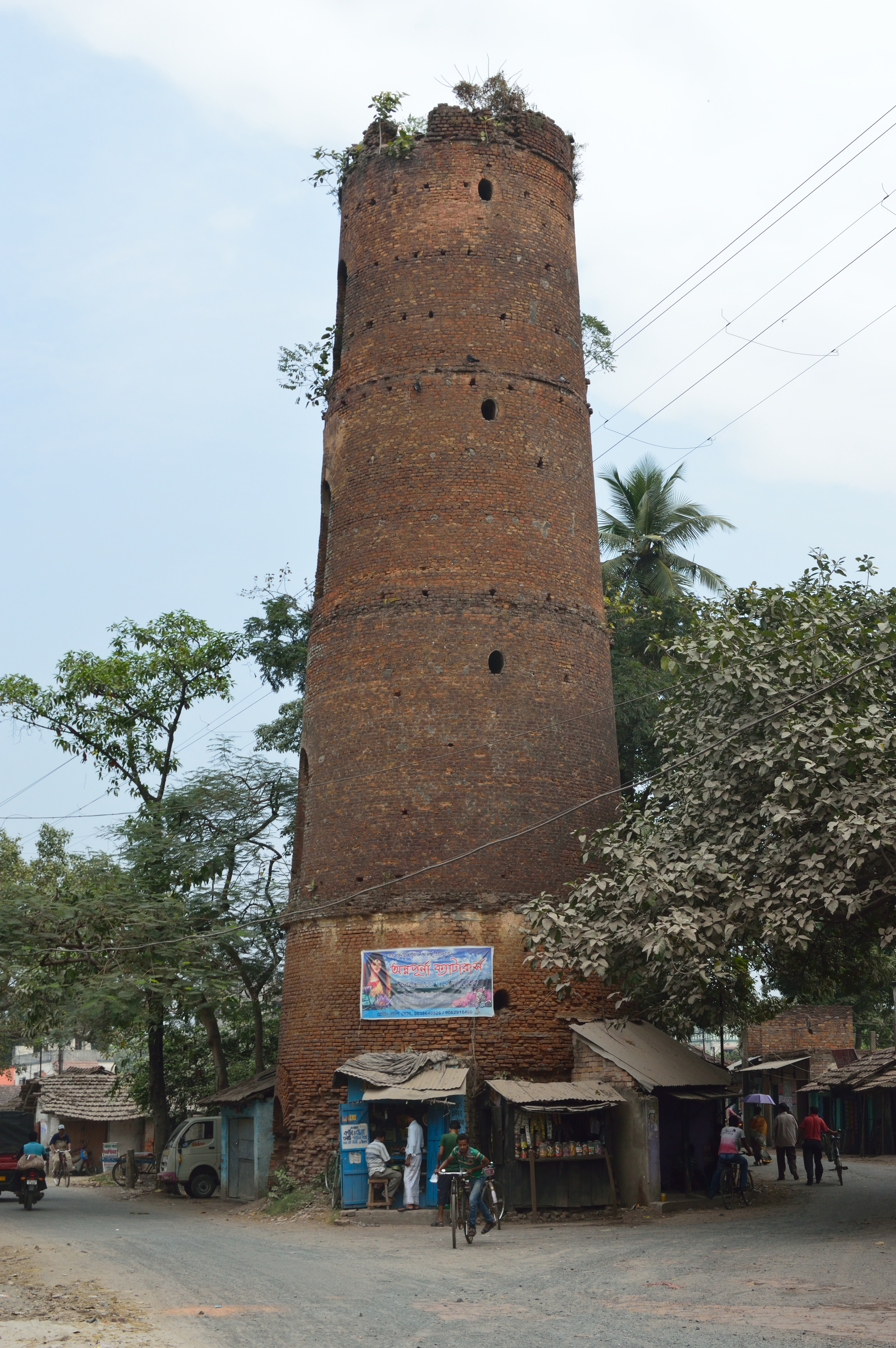
The British made abandoned Semaphore Tower, Mahiari, Andul

"Kamal Nursery" and "The Indian Nursery" two of the most famous names in the Indian horticulture industry are situated at Mahiari, Andul. Howrah Flower Growers' Association organize flower exhibition at Kamal Nursery every year. Manufacturing and fabrication of wooden furniture forms livelihood of a large number of population. This particular handcraft is popular throughout the district and the fame has reached outside the state also. Most of the population is associated with different service based industry like finance, education, Information Technology and Software. Modern days has seen rapid industrial growth in the outskirts of the village as it is closely associated with nearby Jangalpur and Dhulagori industrial estates.

== Places to visit ==
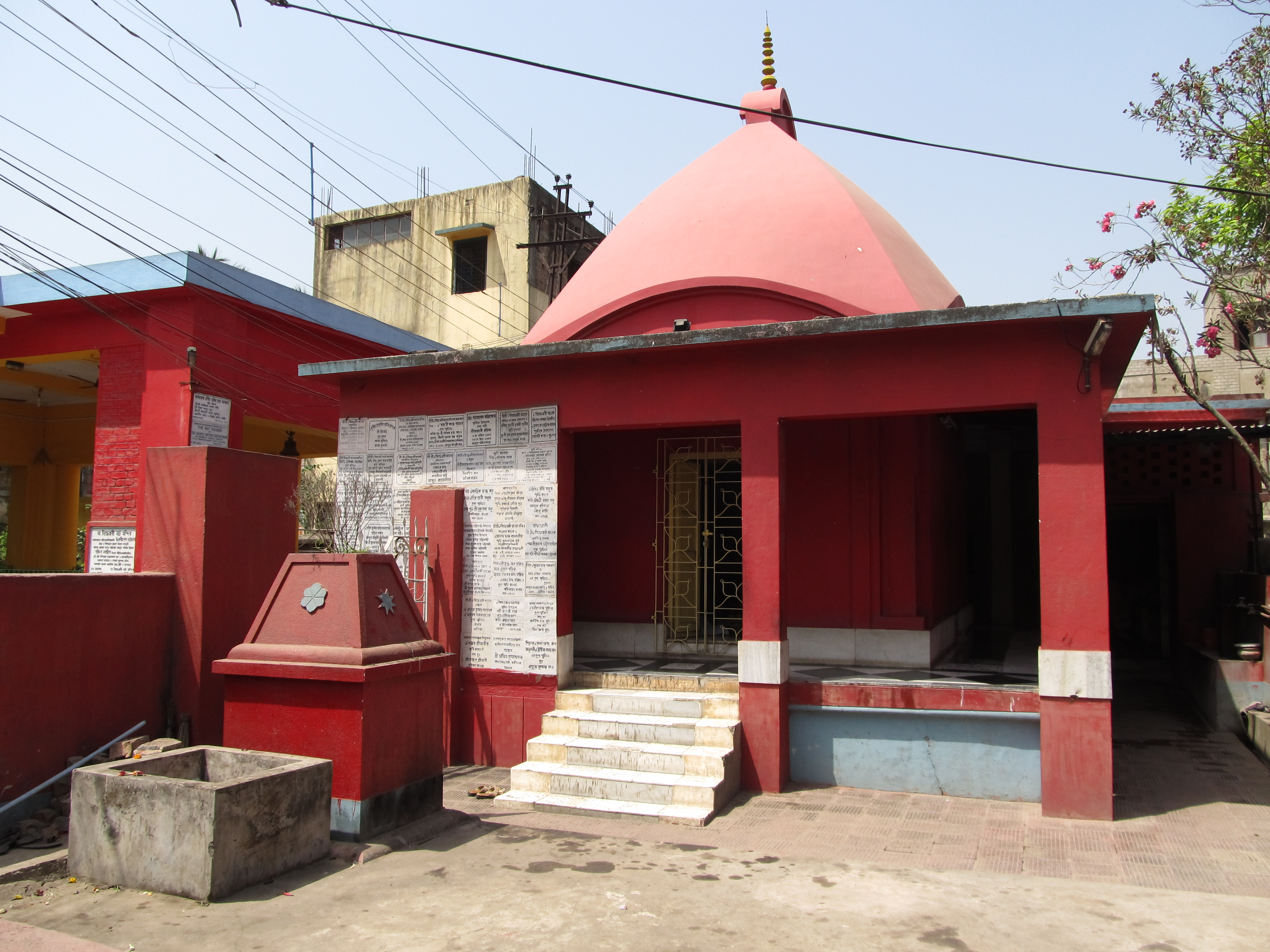
Sankari Temple (or, Shiddeshwari Kali Temple), official deity of Andul

- Andul Royal Palace (or, Andul Rajbari).
- Jhorehat Harisabha Griha.
- Annapurna Temple.
- Dutta Chowdhury family Durga mandap
- Kashiswara Jiu temple.
- Madhaveshwar temple.
- Sankari Temple (or, Shiddeshwari Kali Temple).
- Sadhak Bhairavi's Cave.
- Premikh Bhawan (Majher bari).
- Kamal Nursery
- Kundu Chowdhury House (or, Kundu Bari), Mahiari.
- Panchananda Temple, Mahiari.
- Rasa-Mancha, Mahiari.
- Mahiari Public Library.
- Khetropaul Baba Ashram, Mashila.
- Ganges River Side, Basudevpur.
- Panchannan Temple, Puillya

== Educational Institutes ==
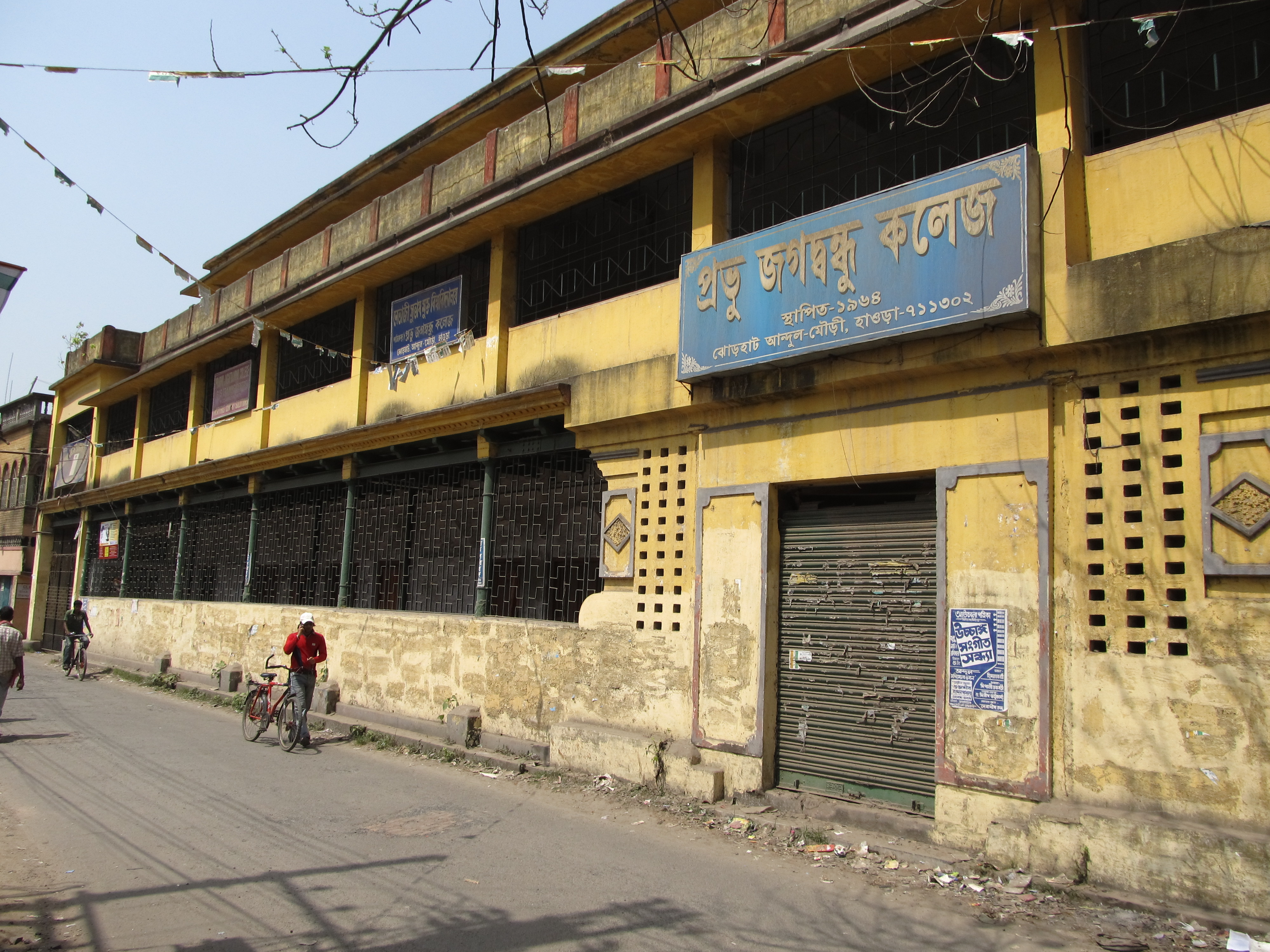
Prabhu Jagatbandhu College, Andul, Howrah

1. New Andul Higher class school.
2. Kishalaya KG school
3. Shatadal Institution
4. Ranibala High school, Mahiary.
5. Mohiary Kundu Chowdhury Institution.
6. Mohiary High school
7. Prabhu Jagatbandhu College.
8. Gramahitakai girls high school
9. Holy Kids English Medium School
10. Shyamsundar Prathomik Vidyalaya
11. Jhorehat Fakirchandra High School.

== Transport ==
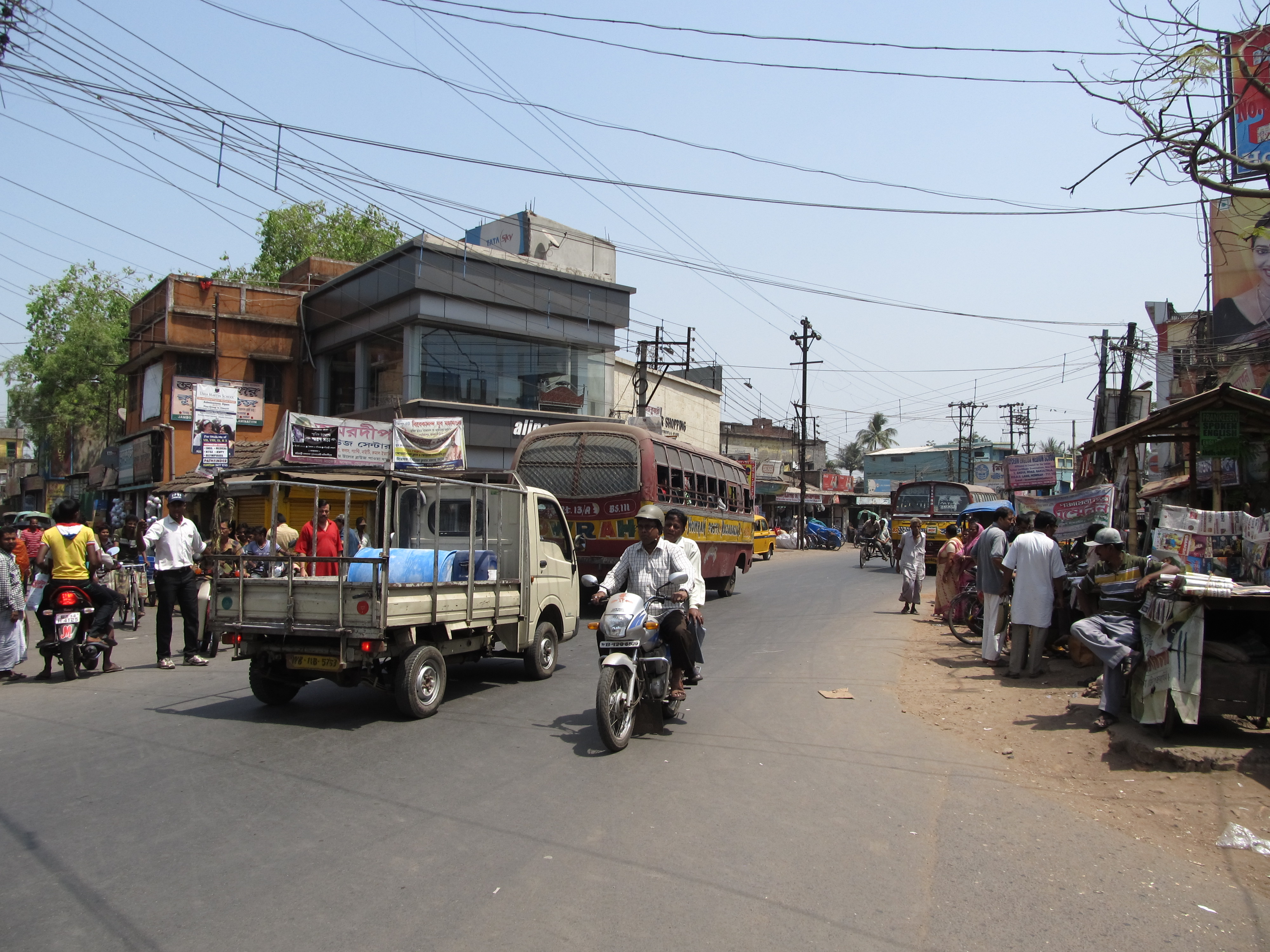
Andul Bus Stop, Andul Road (part of SH 6)

Andul Road (part of Grand Trunk Road/State Highway 6) is the artery of the town.

=== Bus ===
==== Private Bus ====
- 61 Alampur - Howrah Station

==== Mini Bus ====
- 13 Ranihati - Rajabazar
- 13A Fatikgachi - Rajabazar
- 20 Alampur - Ultadanga Station

==== Bus Routes Without Numbers ====
- Mourigram railway station - Barrackpur Cantonment
- Andul railway station - New Town Ecospace

=== Train ===
Andul railway station and Mourigram railway station on Howrah-Kharagpur line are the nearest railway stations.

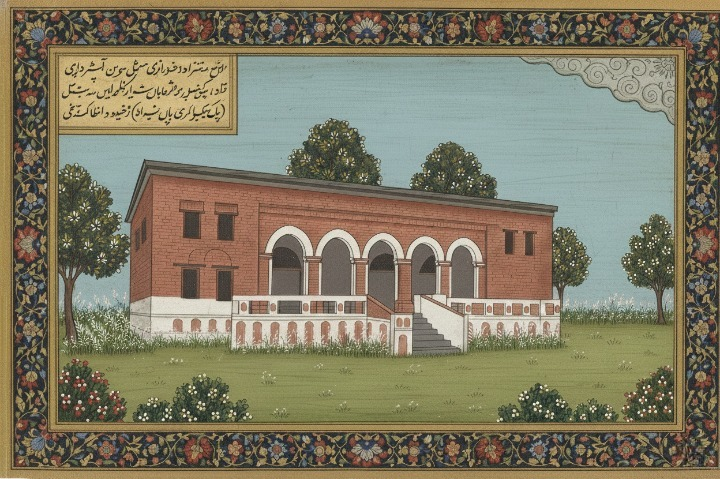
Durga Dalan of Dutta Chowdhury family of Andul, Howrah
