= State Highway 6 (West Bengal) =

State highway in West Bengal

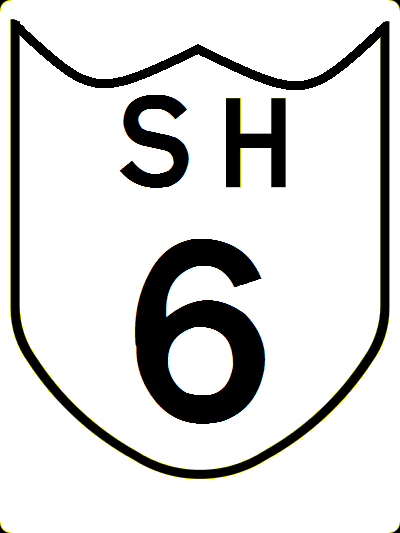
State Highway 6

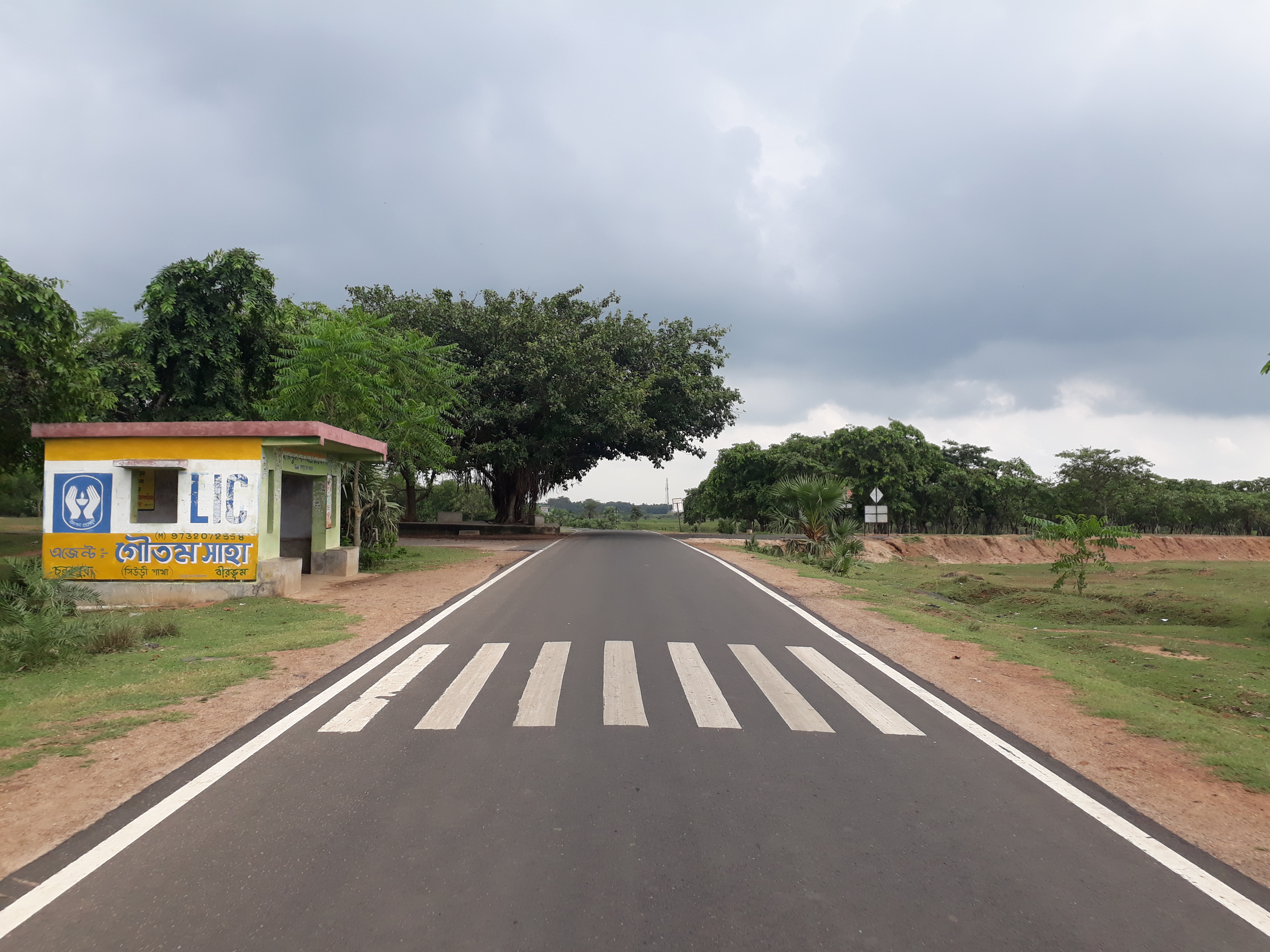

Route information
- Length: 266 km (165 mi)

Major junctions
- From: Rajnagar
- Suri-Bolpur Road at Purandarpur; NH 114 and SH 13 at Ahmadpur; SH 7 at Kumardanga; SH 14 from Jajigram to High Road Morh; SH 15 at High Road Morh; SH 8 from Hematpur Morh to Nadanghat Morh; Belghoria Expressway near Bally Ghat railway station Kona Expressway at Santasir Morh
- To: Alampur – Junction with NH 16

Location
- Country: India
- State: West Bengal
- Districts: Birbhum, Purba Bardhaman, Hooghly and Howrah

Highway system
- Roads in India; Expressways; National; State; Asian; State Highways in West Bengal

State Highway 6 (West Bengal) is a state highway in West Bengal, India.

== Route ==
SH 6 originates from Rajnagar and passes through Chandrapur, Suri, Purandarpur, Ahmadpur, Labhpur, Kirnahar, Kandra, Guptipara, Behula Ketugram, Katwa, Nabadwip, Kalna, Jirat, Saptagram (from here it is the old Grand Trunk Road), Chinsurah, Chandannagar, Bhadreswar, Baidyabati, Serampore, Rishra, Konnagar, Uttarpara, Bally, Belur, Salkia, Shibpur, Podrah, Andul and terminates at its junction with NH 16 at Alampur.

The total length of SH 6 is 266 km.

Districts traversed by SH 6 are:
Birbhum district (0 – 76 km)
Purba Bardhaman district (76 – 169 km)
Hooghly district (169 – 242 km)
Howrah district (242 – 266 km)

== Road sections ==
It is divided into different sections as follows:

Road Section	District	CD Block	Length (km)
Rajnagar-Suri	Birbhum	Rajnagar, Suri I	26
Suri-Ahmedpur	Birbhum	Sainthia	21
Ahmedpur-Kirnahar-Ramjibanpur	Birbhum	Labpur	29
Ramjibanpur-Ketugram-Katwa	Purba Bardhaman	Ketugram I, Ketugram II, Katwa I, Katwa II	23
Saptagram Tribeni Kalna Katwa Road (Purba Bardhaman part)	Purba Bardhaman	Purbasthali I, Purbasthali II, Kalna I, Kalna II	70
Saptagram Tribeni Kalna Katwa Road (Hooghly part)	Hooghly	Balagarh	33
Saptagram-Uttarpara GT Road	Hooghly	Chinsurah Mogra, Singur, Sreerampur Uttarpara	40
Uttarpara-Howrah-Botanical Garden GT Road	Howrah	Bally Jagachha, Sankrail	13
Botanical Garden-Alampur	Howrah	-	11

== See also ==
- List of state highways in West Bengal
