= Andul railway station =

Railway station in West Bengal, India

Andul
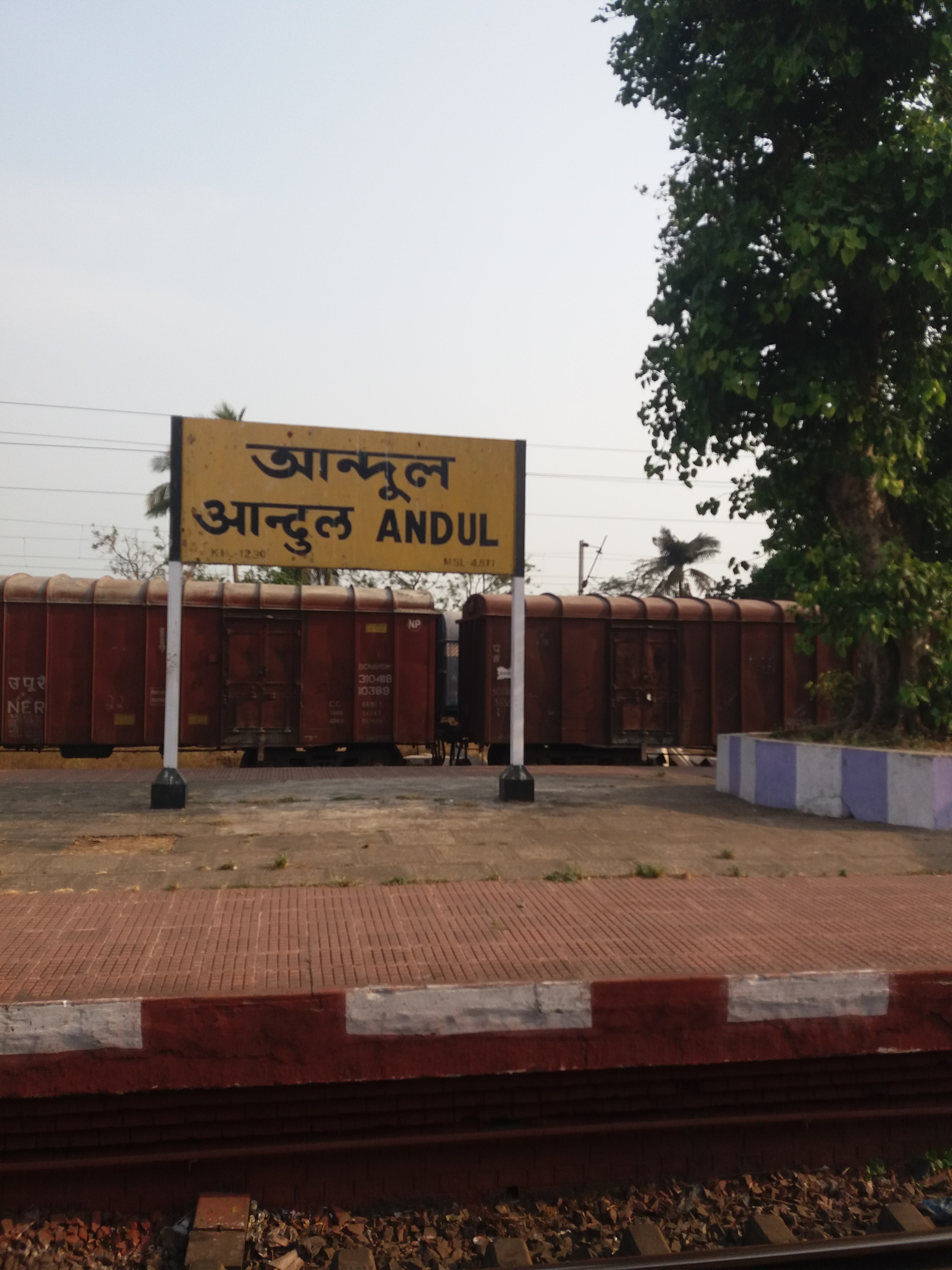

General information
- Location: Andul railway station road, Rajarbagan, Andul, Howrah district, West Bengal; India
- Coordinates: 22°34′31″N 88°14′23″E
- Elevation: 7 metres (23 ft)
- System: Kolkata Suburban Railway
- Owner: Indian Railways
- Line: Howrah–Kharagpur line
- Platforms: 5
- Tracks: 8

Construction
- Structure type: Standard on-ground station
- Parking: Under Construction
- Cycle facilities: yes

Other information
- Station code: ADL
- Fare zone: South Eastern Railway

History
- Opened: 1900
- Electrified: 1967–69

Services
Preceding station	Kolkata Suburban Railway	Following station
Sankrail towards Midnapore	South Eastern Line Howrah–Kharagpur line	Mourigram towards Howrah Junction
Bankranayabaz towards Sealdah	Chord link Line	Terminus
Route map
Location
- Location within West Bengal Location within India

Andul railway station, in the Howrah district of the Indian state of West Bengal, serves Andul, India. It is situated on the Howrah–Kharagpur line and is approximately 12 kilometres (7.5 mi) from Howrah Station.

== History ==
Andul railway station (ADL) is a railway station located in Andul in the Howrah district of West Bengal, India. It is operated by the South Eastern Railway (SER) zone of Indian Railways and falls under the Kharagpur railway division. The station is part of the Kolkata Suburban Railway system and is situated on the Howrah–Kharagpur line, approximately 12 km from Howrah Junction. Andul is an important railway station on the western side of the Kolkata metropolitan area, serving suburban passengers as well as through railway traffic operating on the South Eastern Railway network.

The station has five platforms and eight tracks, with the railway infrastructure at Andul forming part of the heavily used Howrah–Kharagpur suburban corridor. The Howrah–Kharagpur railway line was opened in 1900, while the section was electrified during 1967–1969 as part of the electrification of the suburban railway network around Kolkata. The station has subsequently developed into an important operational point because of the large volume of suburban, long-distance and freight railway movements passing through the surrounding railway network.

== Major Trains ==
Train No.	Train name	Route	Frequency
13433	SMVT Bengaluru–Malda Town Amrit Bharat Express	SMVT Bengaluru → Malda Town	Weekly
13434	Malda Town–SMVT Bengaluru Amrit Bharat Express	Malda Town → SMVT Bengaluru	Weekly
15673	Charlapalli–Kamakhya Amrit Bharat Express	Charlapalli → Kamakhya	Weekly
15674	Kamakhya–Charlapalli Amrit Bharat Express	Kamakhya → Charlapalli	Weekly
16223	SMVT Bengaluru–Radhikapur Express	SMVT Bengaluru → Radhikapur	Weekly
16224	Radhikapur–SMVT Bengaluru Express	Radhikapur → SMVT Bengaluru	Weekly
16523	SMVT Bengaluru–Balurghat Express	SMVT Bengaluru → Balurghat	Weekly
16524	Balurghat–SMVT Bengaluru Express	Balurghat → SMVT Bengaluru	Weekly
18033	Howrah–Ghatsila MEMU Express	Howrah → Ghatsila	Daily
18405	Puri–Patna Express	Puri → Patna	Daily
18406	Patna–Puri Express	Patna → Puri	Daily
20603	New Jalpaiguri–Nagercoil Amrit Bharat Express	New Jalpaiguri → Nagercoil	Weekly
20609	New Jalpaiguri–Tiruchchirappalli Amrit Bharat Express	New Jalpaiguri → Tiruchchirappalli	Weekly
12503	SMVT Bengaluru–Agartala Humsafar Express	SMVT Bengaluru → Agartala	Weekly
12504	Agartala–SMVT Bengaluru Humsafar Express	Agartala → SMVT Bengaluru	Weekly

== Andul Calcutta Chord Link Line ==
Andul has additional operational importance because of its connection with the Andul–Dankuni section of the Calcutta Chord Link. The approximately 14-kilometre connection links Andul on the South Eastern Railway network with Dankuni Junction, which is part of the Eastern Railway network. The link provides a direct connection between the railway systems on the western and eastern sides of the Kolkata metropolitan area and allows trains to move between the South Eastern Railway and Eastern Railway networks without necessarily passing through the main Howrah terminal area. Therefore, while Andul is administratively a station of South Eastern Railway and is not itself a formal railway-zone boundary station, its connection towards Dankuni gives it importance as an inter-zonal railway connectivity point between the South Eastern and Eastern Railway networks.

The Andul–Dankuni connection was originally planned to provide a more direct railway route between the South Eastern Railway network and the Calcutta Chord, thereby facilitating the movement of trains towards Calcutta and reducing dependence on more congested routes. Historical Parliamentary records from the 1960s describe the proposed link as an important connection for South Eastern Railway traffic. The route was subsequently electrified in the early 1970s. In more recent years, capacity augmentation has been undertaken on the connection, including the doubling of the Andul–Baltikuri section, commissioned in January 2020, and the Baltikuri–Bhattanagar section, commissioned in October 2021. These works increased the capacity of the railway connection between the South Eastern and Eastern Railway systems.

== Amrit Bharat Station ==
Andul railway station has also been selected for redevelopment under the Amrit Bharat Station Scheme (ABSS), the Indian Railways programme for the modernization and redevelopment of railway stations across India. The scheme aims to improve passenger amenities and station infrastructure through measures such as improved station access and circulating areas, upgraded waiting areas, toilets, platform facilities, passenger information systems, accessibility facilities, lifts and escalators, parking arrangements and other passenger-oriented infrastructure. Andul is included among the stations selected under the scheme in West Bengal.

The South Eastern Railway's 2025–26 works programme includes station development work at Andul under the Amrit Bharat Station Scheme, with a sanctioned cost of approximately ₹6.34 crore. The development forms part of the broader modernization of railway infrastructure in the Kolkata metropolitan region. As the project is being undertaken in an existing operational railway environment, implementation is being carried out alongside the continuing movement of suburban, long-distance and freight trains through the area.

Andul's importance is therefore associated not only with its role as a suburban passenger station but also with its position on the Howrah–Kharagpur corridor and its connection to the Andul–Dankuni route. The combination of its location on the South Eastern Railway network, its multiple railway lines and platforms, its connection with the Eastern Railway network through Dankuni, and its inclusion in the Amrit Bharat Station Scheme makes Andul an important railway infrastructure point in the western Kolkata metropolitan region.
