= State Highway 15 (West Bengal) =

Road in West Bengal, India

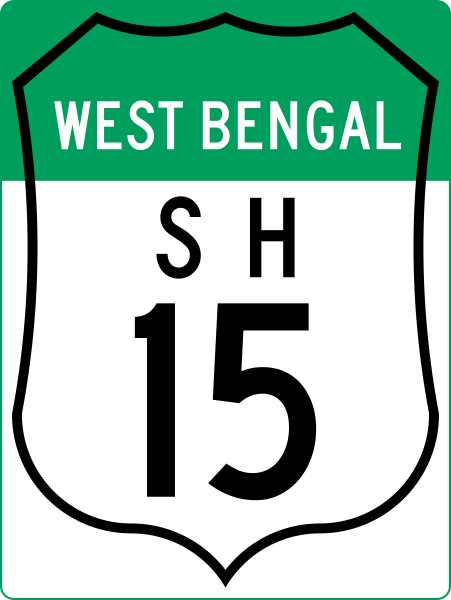
State Highway 15
- Ahilyabai Holkar Road.
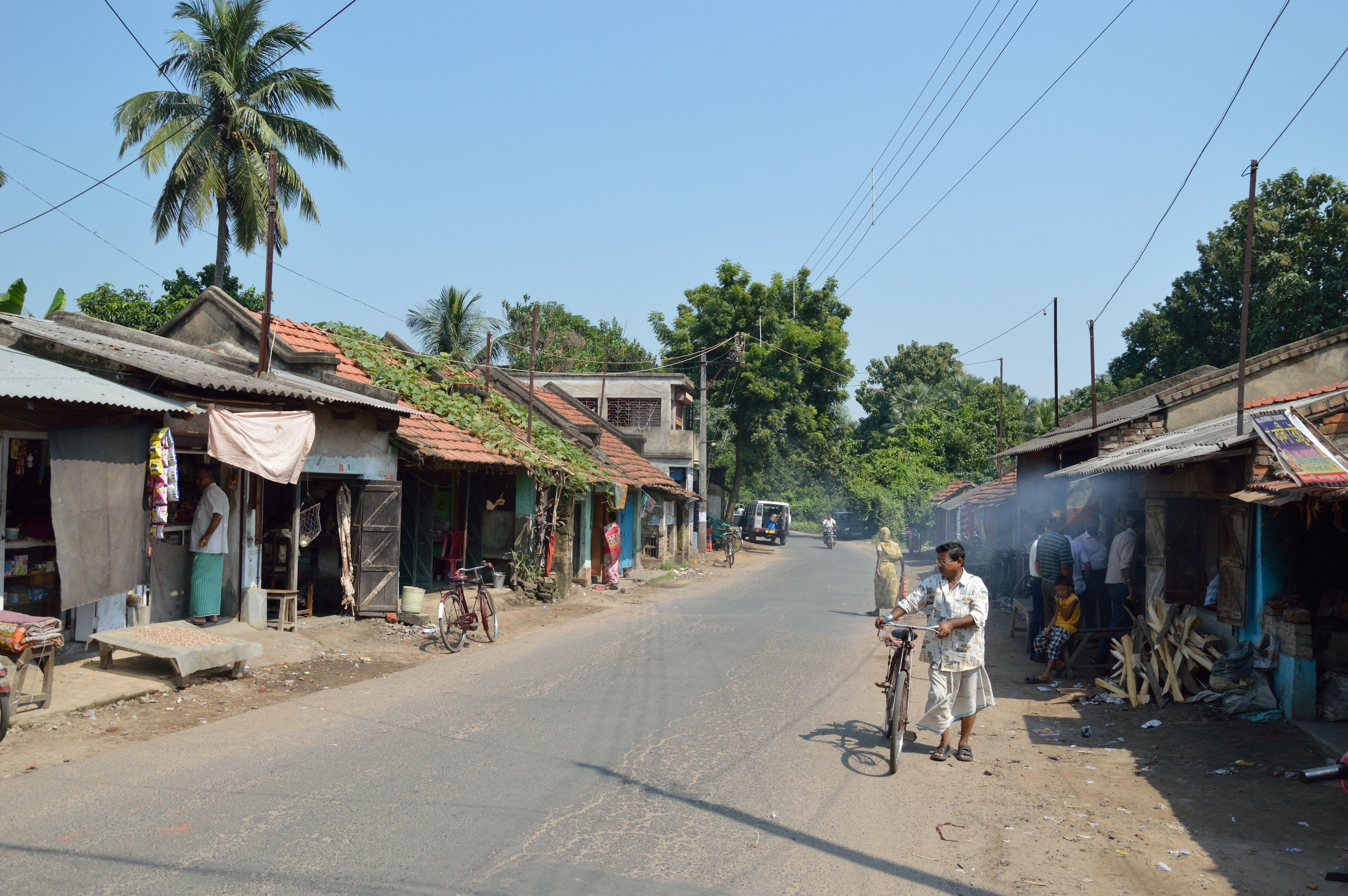

Route information

Major junctions
- From: Junction with SH 6 and SH 14 at High Road Morh, near Dainhat
- Dainhat Road at Chandrapur Bus Stand connecting to SH 14 at Balgona; SH 8 at Kusumgram; Kalna Road at Satgachia; SH 13/ GT Road at Memari; NH 19 / Durgapur Expressway at Masagram; Dasghara-Gurap-Mogra 23 no Road at Dasghara; Dasghara-Dhaniakhali-Chinsurah 17 no Road at Dasghara; SH 2 from Tarakeswar to Champadanga; Haripal-Jangipara Road at Parbatipur; Masat-Munsirhat Road at Masat; TN Mukherji Road at Dankuni linking to NH 19; Benarsas Road at Kona High Road Crossing; NH 16 from Kona High Road crossing to Salap; Mushirhat-Sankrail Road at Jadupur; NH 16 at Bagnan; Antila Road at Antila Bus Stop; Naul-Gopinathpur Road at Shyampur; Dharsa Morh on Grand Trunk Road/SH 6 with SH 13 at Par-Dankuni; SH 6 with NH 19 at Kanaipur; NH 19 with SH 13 at Chanditala Bus Stand.
- To: Gadiara

Location
- Country: India
- State: West Bengal
- Districts: Bardhaman, Hooghly, Howrah

Highway system
- Roads in India; Expressways; National; State; Asian; State Highways in West Bengal

State Highway 15 (West Bengal), is a state highway in West Bengal, India.

== Route ==
SH 15 originates from junction with SH 6 and SH 14 at High Road Morh, near Dainhat (in Bardhaman district) and passes through Chandrapur, Monteswar, Kusumgram, Memari, Masagram, Jamalpur, Dasghara, Tarakeswar, Champadanga, Masat, Chanditala, Dankuni, Domjur, Bargachia, Munsirhat, Amta, Bagnan, Khalor and Shyampur and terminates at Gadiara (in Howrah district). Recently in January 2022, the road from Dharsa Morh to Naity Block Development Office(BDO), commonly known as Naity Road has been renumbered as State Highway 15A(SH-15A) since the road is connecting Grand Trunk Road/SH 6 with SH 13 at Par Dankuni, with National Highway 19(NH-19) at Dankuni and further with SH 15 at Chanditala Bus Stand.

The total length of SH 15 is 256 kilometres (159 mi).

National Highway Authority of India or NHAI has proposed to include section of SH 15 from Champadanga via Masat, Chanditala to Dankuni under a new National Highway from 2022/23. But Highway number is still not decided & will be notified later. The new highway will connect Jhargram with Dankuni via Jhilimili, Mukutmanipur, Simlapal, Taldangra, Bishnupur, Jaypur, Kotulpur, Arambag, Champadanga & Chanditala. The new proposed National Highway will merge SH 2, SH 5 & SH 15 into a single route covering distance of 296 kilometres (184 mi).

Districts traversed by SH 15 are:
Bardhaman district (from 0 to 87.66 km)
Hooghly district (from 87.66 to 148.15 km)
Howrah district (from 148.15 to 247.15 km)

== Road sections ==
It is divided into different sections as follows:

Road Section	District	CD Block	Length (km)
Dainhat-Manteswar	Bardhaman	Katwa II, Manteswar	30
Manteswar-Memari	Bardhaman	Memari I, Memari II	32
Memari- Dasghara	Bardhaman	Jamalpur	31
Dasghara-Tarakeswar	Hooghly	Dhaniakhali, Tarakeswar	13
Tarakeswar-Champadanga	Hooghly	Tarakeswar	6
Champadanga-Chanditala (Ahalyabai Holkar Road)	Hooghly	Haripal, Chanditala I, Chanditala II	36
Chanditala-Eksara	Howrah	Domjur	14
Eksara-Salap (via NH 16)	Howrah	-	4
Salap-Bargachhia-Munsirhat-Amta	Howrah	Jagatballavpur, Munshirhat ,Amta I	36
Amta-Bagnan	Howrah	Bagnan I, Bagnan II	13
Bagnan-Shyampur-Gadiara	Howrah	Shyampur II, Shyampur I	37

== See also ==
- List of state highways in West Bengal
