= Bally Jagachha =

- Community development block
- Location in West Bengal
- Coordinates: 22°38′38″N 88°19′30″E
- Country: India
- State: West Bengal
- District: Howrah
- Parliamentary constituency: Sreerampur
- Assembly constituency: Domjur

Area
  - Total: 27.82 sq mi (72.05 km^{2})

Population (2011)
  - Total: 209,504
  - Density: 7,531/sq mi (2,908/km^{2})
- Time zone: UTC+5.30 (IST)
- Vehicle registration: WB-11, WB-12, WB-13, WB-14
- Literacy Rate: 87.75 per cent
- Website: http://howrah.gov.in/

Bally Jagachha is a community development block that forms an administrative division in Howrah Sadar subdivision of Howrah district in the Indian state of West Bengal.

== Geography ==
Map of Howrah District

=== Location ===
Bally is located at 22°37′46″N 88°20′53″E.

Bally Jagachha CD Block is bounded by Chanditala II and Sreerampur Uttarpara CD Blocks, in Hooghly district, in the north, Kolkata, across the Hooghly River in the east and part of the south, Sankrail CD Block in part of the south and Domjur CD Block in the west.

It is located 8 km from Howrah, the district headquarters.

=== Area and administration ===
Bally Jagachha CD Block has an area of 72.05 km^{2}. Nischinda Police Station and Liluah Police Station of Howrah City Police serve this CD Block. Bally Jagachha panchayat samity has 8 gram panchayats. The block has 3 inhabited villages. Headquarters of this block is at Kona.

=== Topography ===
Howrah district is located on the west bank of the Hooghly. The Rupnarayan flows on the west and south of the district and the Damodar intersects it. The district consists of a flat alluvial plain.

=== Gram panchayats ===
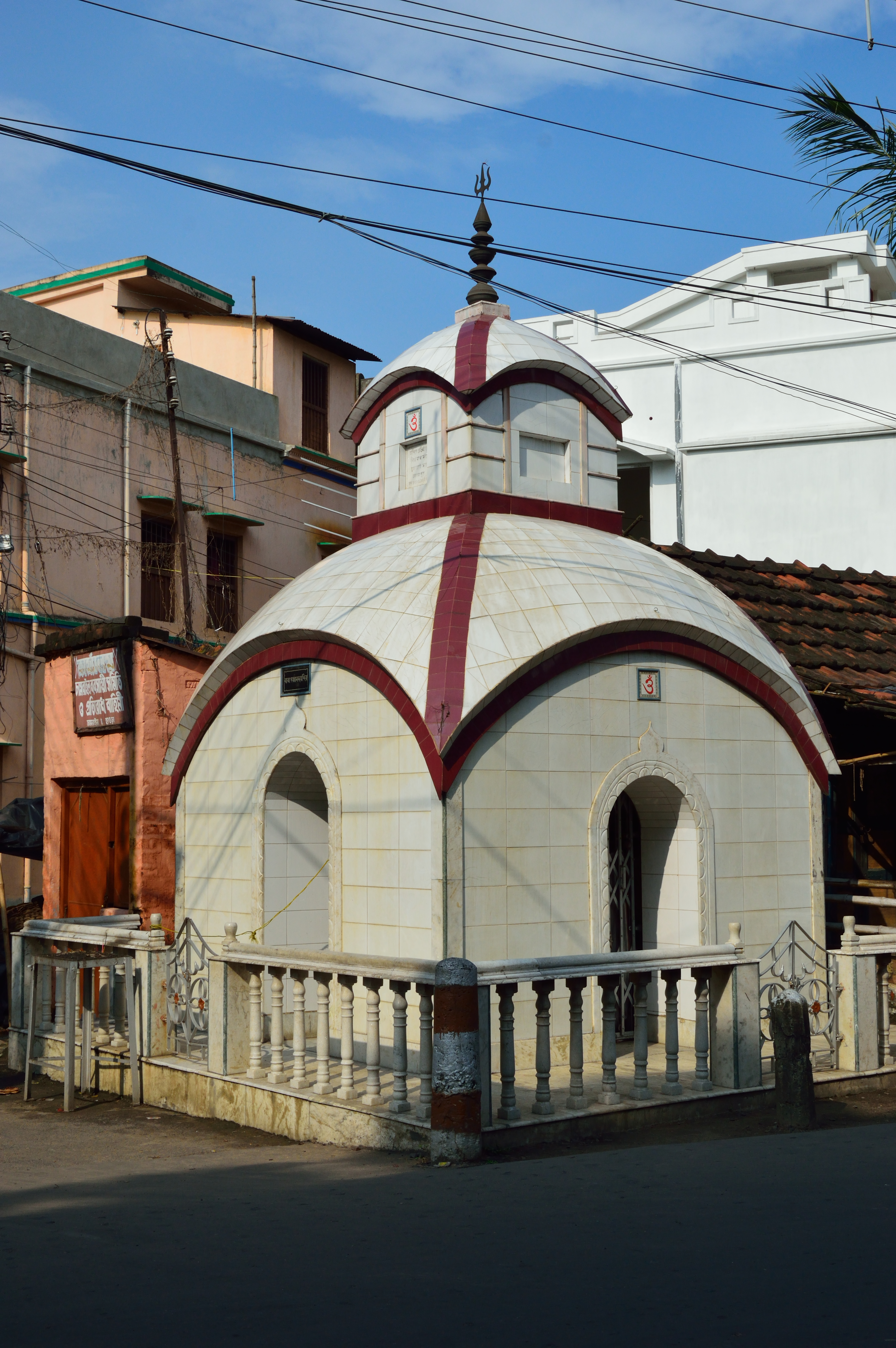
Baba Panchananda Mandir, Chamrail, Bally Jagachha block

Gram panchayats of Bally Jagachha block/panchayat samiti are: Bally, Chakpara Anandanagar, Chamrail, Durgapur Abhaynagar I, Durgapur Abhaynagar II, Jagadishpur, Nischinda and Sanpuipara Basukati.

== Demographics ==
=== Overview ===
Rural population is 49.63% of the total population of Howrah district as per 2001 census. Scheduled castes account for 15.41% of the population, scheduled tribes 0.44% and Muslims 24.4% of the population. As the economy is prevalently industrial, majority of the population depends on industries for a living. Only 30% of the population is engaged in cultivation.

BPL families in CD Blocks
of Howrah district
Howrah Sadar subdivision
Bally Jagachha – 4.35%
Domjur – 7.21%
Panchla – 1.82%
Sankrail – 5.67%
Jagatballavpur – 10.35%
Uluberia subdivision
Uluberia I – 23.38%
Uluberia II – 19.76%
Amta I – 16.07%
Amta II – 16.38%
Udaynarayanpur – 14.12%
Bagnan I – 18.87%
Bagnan II – 21.18%
Shyampur I – 36.51%
Shyampur II – 17.85%
Source: Rural Household
Survey 2005

=== Population ===
As per 2011 Census of India Bally Jagachha CD Block had a total population of 209,504, of which 9,300 were rural and 200,204 were uban. There were 107,926 (52%) males and 101,578 (48%) females. Population below 6 years was 19,915. Scheduled Castes numbered 30,615 and Scheduled Tribes numbered 1,823.

As per 2001 census, Bally Jagachha block had a total population of 164,520, out of which 86,409 were males and 78,111 were females. Bally Jagacha block registered a population growth of 28.63 per cent during the 1991-2001 decade. Decadal growth for Howrah district was 12.76 per cent. Decadal growth in West Bengal was 17.84 per cent. Scheduled castes at 31,141 formed around one-fifth the population. Scheduled tribes numbered 3,629.

=== Census Towns and large village ===
Census Towns in Bally Jagachha CD Block (2011 census figures in brackets): Jagadishpur (16,259), Jaypur Bil (9,598), Bally (113,377), Chakapara (35,282), Chamrail (11,923), Eksara (7,500) and Khalia (6,265).

The following Municipalities and Census Towns in Howrah district were part of Kolkata Urban Agglomeration in 2011 census: Howrah (Municipal Corporation), Bally (Municipality) (now amalgamed with Howrah Municipal Corporation), Bally (Census Town), Jagadishpur (CT), Chamrail (CT), Eksara (CT), Chakapara (CT) Khalia (CT), Jaypur Bil (CT), (all, except Howrah municipal corporation and Bally municipality, in Bally Jagachha CD Block), Bankra (CT), Nibra (CT), Mahiari (CT), Bipra Noapara (CT), Ankurhati (CT), Kantlia (CT), Salap (CT), Tentulkuli (CT), Domjur (CT), Dakshin Jhapardaha (CT), Makardaha (CT), Khantora (CT), Bhandardaha (CT), (all in Domjur CD Block), Kamranga (CT), Argari (CT), Andul (CT), Ramchandrapur (CT), Jhorhat (CT), Hatgachha (CT), Dhuilya (CT), Panchpara (CT), Podara (CT), Banupur (CT), Sankrail (CT), Manikpur (CT), Sarenga (CT), Raghudebbati (CT) Nalpur (CT), Chak Srikrishna (Out Growth), (all in Sankrail CD Block), Uluberia (M) Khalisani (CT) Uttar Pirpur (CT) Balaram Pota (CT), Santoshpur (CT) (all except Uluberia municipality in Uluberia II CD Block).

As per 2011 census there was only one large village (4,000+population) in Bally Jagachha CD Block (2011 census figure in brackets): Debirpara (6,517).

=== Literacy ===
As per 2011 census the total number of literates in Bally Jagachha CD Block was 166,364 (87.75% of the population over 6 years) out of which 89,030 (54%) were males and 77,334 (46%) were females.

As per 2011 census, literacy in Howrah district was 78.66%. Literacy in West Bengal was 77.08% in 2011. Literacy in India in 2011 was 74.04%.

As per 2001 census, Bally Jagachha block had a total literacy of 84.44 per cent for the 6+ age group. While male literacy was 89.24 per cent female literacy was 79.08 per cent. Howrah district had a total literacy of 77.01 per cent, male literacy being 83.22 per cent and female literacy being 70.11 per cent.

Literacy in CD blocks of
Howrah district
Howrah Sadar subdivision
Bally Jagachha – 87.75%
Domjur – 81.33%
Panchla – 78.98%
Sankrail – 83.11%
Jagatballavpur – 79.22%
Uluberia subdivision
Uluberia I – 77.39%
Uluberia II – 78.05%
Amta I – 81.26%
Amta II – 81.47%
Udaynarayanpur – 81.05%
Bagnan I – 84.09%
Bagnan II – 82.57%
Shyampur I – 78.96%
Shyampur II – 80.49%
Source: 2011 Census: CD Block Wise
Primary Census Abstract Data

=== Religion and language ===
Religion in Bally Jagachha CD block (2011)
Hinduism	94.09%
Islam	4.70%
Christianity	0.64%
Other or not stated	0.57%

In 2011 census Hindus numbered 197,131 and formed 94.09% of the population in Bally Jagacha CD Block. Muslims numbered 9,852 and formed 4.70% of the population. Others numbered 2,521 and formed 1.21% of the population.

Languages of Bally Jagachha CD block (2011)
1. Bengali (79.9%)
2. Hindi (17.4%)
3. Others (2.69%)

At the time of the 2011 census, 79.87% of the population spoke Bengali and 17.44% Hindi as their first language.

== Economy ==
=== Infrastructure ===
Prior to 2003-04, Bally Jagachha CD Block had 143 hectares of vested land, out of which 83 hectares were distributed amongst 1,894 persons. In Bally Jagachha CD Block more than one crop was grown in 406 hectares. Net area sown in the block was 1,731 hectares. Bally Jagachha had 180 hectares of canals for irrigation. In Bally Jagachha CD Block 3 mouzas were electrified up to March 2004.

== Education ==
In 2003-04, Bally Jagachha CD Block had 64 primary schools with 8,830 students, 3 middle schools with 995 students, 8 high schools with 3,925 students and 7 higher secondary schools with 5,830 students. Bally Jagachha CD Block had 195 institutions with 19,893 students for special and non-formal education. It had 1 mass literacy centre.

== Healthcare ==
Bally Jagachha CD Block had 4 health centres and 2 clinics, with 29 beds and 8 doctors in 2003. It had 39 family welfare centres.
