= Sankrail (community development block) =

- Community development block
- Coordinates: 22°35′10″N 88°14′12″E
- Country: India
- State: West Bengal
- District: Howrah
- Parliamentary constituency: Howrah
- Assembly constituency: Sankrail, Howrah Dakshin

Area
  - Total: 14.15 sq mi (36.64 km^{2})
- Elevation: 23 ft (7 m)

Population (2011)
  - Total: 343,933
  - Density: 24,310/sq mi (9,387/km^{2})
- Time zone: UTC+5.30 (IST)
- PIN: 711313 (Sankrail); 711309 (Delta Mill); 711302 (Andul Mouri)
- Area code: 033
- Vehicle registration: WB-11, WB-12, WB-13, WB-14
- Literacy Rate: 83.11 per cent
- Website: http://howrah.gov.in/; http://sankrail.com

Sankrail is a community development block that forms an administrative division in Howrah Sadar subdivision of Howrah district in the Indian state of West Bengal.

== Geography ==
Map of Howrah District

=== Location ===
Andul Mouri (post office) is located at 22°35′10″N 88°14′12″E

Sankrail CD Block is bounded by Domjur and Bally Jagachha CD Blocks in the north, Kolkata, across the Hooghly River, and Budge Budge I and Budge Budge II CD Blocks, in South 24 Parganas district, also across the Hooghly River, in the east and south and Uluberia I and Panchla CD Blocks in the west.

It is located 10 km from Howrah, the district headquarters.

=== Area and administration ===
Sankrail CD Block has an area of 36.64 km^{2}. Sankrail Police Station of Howrah City Police serves this CD Block. Sankrail panchayat samity has 16 gram panchayats. The block has 23 inhabited villages. Headquarters of this block is at Andul Mouri.

=== Topography ===
Howrah district is located on the west bank of the Hooghly. The Rupnarayan flows on the west and south of the district and the Damodar intersects it. The district consists of a flat alluvial plain.

=== Gram panchayats ===
Gram panchayats of Sankrail block/panchayat samiti are: Andul, Banipur I, Banipur II, Dakshin Sankrail, Dhulagari, Duila, Jorhat, Kandua, Manikpur, Mashila, Nalpur, Panchpara, Raghudebbati, Sankrail, Sarenga and Thanamakua.

== Demographics ==
=== Overview ===
Rural population is 49.63% of the total population of Howrah district as per 2001 census. Scheduled castes account for 15.41% of the population, scheduled tribes 0.44% and Muslims 24.4% of the population. As the economy is prevalently industrial, majority of the population depends on industries for a living. Only 30% of the population is engaged in cultivation.

BPL families in CD Blocks
of Howrah district
Howrah Sadar subdivision
Bally Jagachha – 4.35%
Domjur – 7.21%
Panchla – 1.82%
Sankrail – 5.67%
Jagatballavpur – 10.35%
Uluberia subdivision
Uluberia I – 23.38%
Uluberia II – 19.76%
Amta I – 16.07%
Amta II – 16.38%
Udaynarayanpur – 14.12%
Bagnan I – 18.87%
Bagnan II – 21.18%
Shyampur I – 36.51%
Shyampur II – 17.85%
Source: Rural Household
Survey 2005

=== Population ===
As per 2011 Census of India Sankrail CD Block had a total population of 343,933, of which 35,195 were rural and 308,738 were uban. There were 176,748 (51%) males and 167,185 (49%) females. Population below 6 years was 37,531. Scheduled Castes numbered 77,458 and Scheduled Tribes numbered 1,272.

As per 2001 census, Sankrail block had a total population of 290,877, out of which 152,985 were males and 137,892 were females. Sankrail block registered a population growth of 19.46 per cent during the 1991-2001 decade. Decadal growth for Howrah district was 12.76 per cent. Decadal growth in West Bengal was 17.84 per cent. Scheduled castes at 81,840 formed around one-fourth the population. Scheduled tribes numbered 4,237.

=== Census Towns and large villages ===
Census Towns in Sankrail CD Block (2011 census figures in brackets): Dhulagari (23,740), Mirjapur (5,114), Argari (10,715), Andul (6,302), Dhuilya (20,962), Kamranga (4,585), Jhorhat (16,940), Masila (12,239), Kendua (6,338), Nabhghara (5,875), Ramchandrapur (10,312), Hatgachha (5,980), Panchpara (19,283), Podara (21,589), Banupur (9,626), Sankrail (29,114), Sankrailjala (8,812), Osmanpur (5,289), Manikpur (19,804), Sarenga (25,200), Ula (6,738), Nalpur (6,911) and Raghudebbati (14,165).

Outgrowths in Sankrail CD Block (2011 census figures in brackets): Chak Srikrishna, Ward No. 29 (10,123) and Chak Srikrishna, Ward No. 30 (2,982).

The following Municipalities and Census Towns in Howrah district were part of Kolkata Urban Agglomeration in 2011 census: Howrah (Municipal Corporation), Bally (Municipality) (now amalgamed with Howrah Municipal Corporation), Bally (Census Town), Jagadishpur (CT), Chamrail (CT), Eksara (CT), Chakapara (CT) Khalia (CT), Jaypur Bil (CT), (all, except Howrah municipal corporation and Bally municipality, in Bally Jagachha CD Block), Bankra (CT), Nibra (CT), Mahiari (CT), Bipra Noapara (CT), Ankurhati (CT), Kantlia (CT), Salap (CT), Tentulkuli (CT), Domjur (CT), Dakshin Jhapardaha (CT), Makardaha (CT), Khantora (CT), Bhandardaha (CT), (all in Domjur CD Block), Kamranga (CT), Argari (CT), Andul (CT), Ramchandrapur (CT), Jhorhat (CT), Hatgachha (CT), Dhuilya (CT), Panchpara (CT), Podara (CT), Banupur (CT), Sankrail (CT), Manikpur (CT), Sarenga (CT), Raghudebbati (CT) Nalpur (CT), Chak Srikrishna (Out Growth), (all in Sankrail CD Block), Uluberia (M) Khalisani (CT) Uttar Pirpur (CT) Balaram Pota (CT), Santoshpur (CT) (all except Uluberia municipality in Uluberia II CD Block).

In 2011 census there was only one large village (4,000+ population) in Sanrail CD Block (2011 census figure in brackets): Alampur (4,188).

=== Literacy ===
As per 2011 census the total number of literates in Sankrail CD Block was 254,663 (83.11% of the population over 6 years) out of which 136,214 (53%) were males and 118,449 (47%) were females.

As per 2011 census, literacy in Howrah district was 78.66%. Literacy in West Bengal was 77.08% in 2011. Literacy in India in 2011 was 74.04%.

As per 2001 census, Sankrail block had a total literacy of 75.78 per cent for the 6+ age group. While male literacy was 81.38 per cent female literacy was 69.53 per cent. Howrah district had a total literacy of 77.01 per cent, male literacy being 83.22 per cent and female literacy being 70.11 per cent.

Literacy in CD blocks of
Howrah district
Howrah Sadar subdivision
Bally Jagachha – 87.75%
Domjur – 81.33%
Panchla – 78.98%
Sankrail – 83.11%
Jagatballavpur – 79.22%
Uluberia subdivision
Uluberia I – 77.39%
Uluberia II – 78.05%
Amta I – 81.26%
Amta II – 81.47%
Udaynarayanpur – 81.05%
Bagnan I – 84.09%
Bagnan II – 82.57%
Shyampur I – 78.96%
Shyampur II – 80.49%
Source: 2011 Census: CD Block Wise
Primary Census Abstract Data

=== Religion and language ===
Religion in Sankrail CD block (2011)
Hinduism	65.52%
Islam	33.95%
Other or not stated	0.53%

In 2011 census Hindus numbered 216,749 and formed 65.52% of the population in Sankrail CD Block. Muslims numbered 112,312 and formed 33.95% of the population. Others numbered 1,767 and formed 0.53% of the population.

In 2011, Hindus numbered 3,535,844 and formed 72.90% of the population in Howrah district. Muslims numbered 1,270,641 and formed 26.20% of the population. In West Bengal Hindus numbered 64,385,546 and formed 70.53% of the population. Muslims numbered 24,654,825 and formed 27.01% of the population.

Languages of Sankrail CD block (2011)
1. Bengali (90.7%)
2. Hindi (7.60%)
3. Urdu (0.98%)
4. Others (0.47%)

At the time of the 2011 census, 90.71% of the population spoke Bengali, 7.60% Hindi and 0.98% Urdu as their first language.

== Economy ==
=== Infrastructure ===
Prior to 2003-04, Sankrail CD Block had 62 hectares of vested land, out of which 47 hectares were distributed amongst 1,178 persons. In Sankrail CD Block more than one crop was grown in 472 hectares. Net area sown in the block was 1,200 hectares. Sankrail had 730 hectares of canals for irrigation. In Sankrail CD Block 23 mouzas were electrified up to March 2004.

== Education ==
In 2003-04, Sankrail CD Block had 115 primary schools with 22,281 students, 4 middle schools with 616 students, 10 high schools with 13,503 students and 5 higher secondary schools with 6,141 students. Sankrail CD Block had 1 general college with 1,817 students. Sankrail CD Block had 294 institutions with 35,964 students for special and non-formal education. It had 2 mass literacy centres.

== Healthcare ==
Sankrail CD Block had 3 health centres, 5 clinics, 2 dispensaries and 1 hospital with 142 beds and 26 doctors in 2003. It had 35 family welfare centres.
