= Uluberia II =

- Community development block
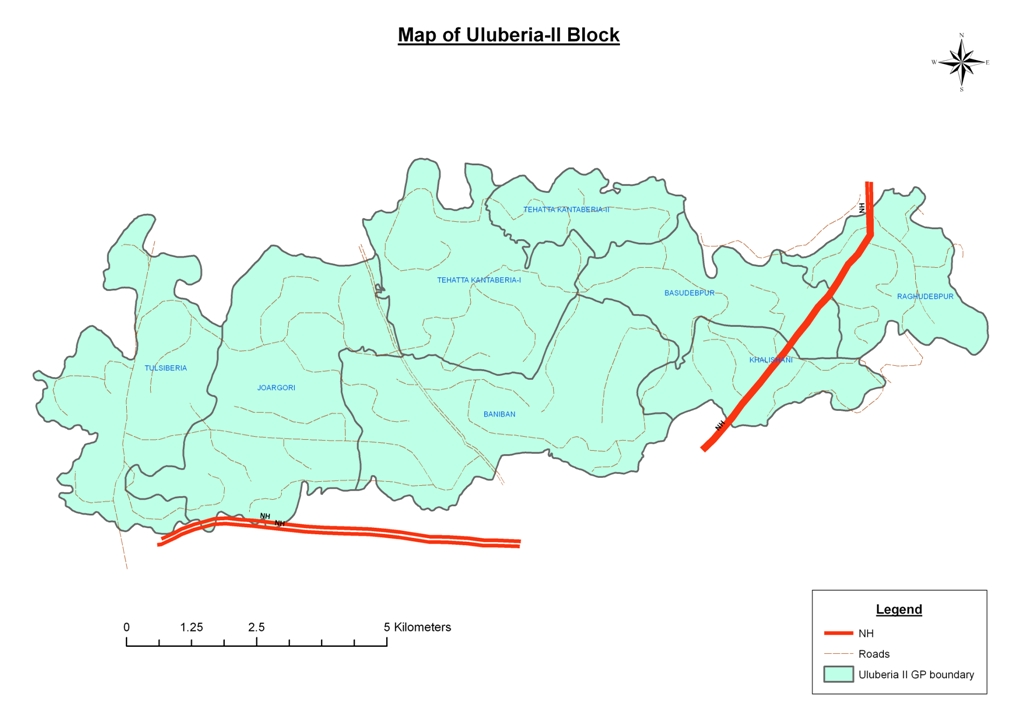
- Map of the Uluberia-ll Block

- Location in West Bengal
- Coordinates: 22°29′40″N 88°05′07″E
- Country: India
- State: West Bengal
- District: Howrah
- Parliamentary constituency: Uluberia
- Assembly constituency: Uluberia Uttar, Uluberia Purba

Area
  - Total: 24.32 sq mi (62.98 km^{2})
- Elevation: 33 ft (10 m)

Population (2011)
  - Total: 191,599
  - Density: 7,879/sq mi (3,042/km^{2})
- Time zone: UTC+5.30 (IST)
- PIN: 711307 (Khalisani); 711316 (Baniban); 711322 (Bikihakola)
- Area code(s): 033; 03214
- Vehicle registration: WB-11, WB-12, WB-13, WB-14
- Literacy Rate: 78.05 per cent
- Website: http://howrah.gov.in/

Uluberia II is a community development block that forms an administrative division in Uluberia subdivision of Howrah district in the Indian state of West Bengal.

== Geography ==
Map of Howrah District

=== Location ===
Baniban, a constituent panchayat of Uluberia II block, is located at 22°29′40″N 88°05′07″E

Uluberia II CD Block is bounded by Amta I, Jagatballavpur and Panchla CD Blocks in the north, Uluberia I in the east and south and Bagnan I CD Block in the west.

It is located 29 km from Howrah, the district headquarters.

=== Area and administration ===
Uluberia II CD Block has an area of 62.98 km^{2}. Uluberia, Rajapur and Bauria police stations serve this CD Block. Uluberia II panchayat samity has 8 gram panchayats. The block has 32 inhabited villages. Headquarters of this block is at Bikihakola.

=== Topography ===
Howrah district is located on the west bank of the Hooghly. The Rupnarayan flows on the west and south of the district and the Damodar intersects it. The district consists of a flat alluvial plain.

=== Gram panchayats ===
Gram panchayats of Uluberia II block/panchayat samiti are: Baniban, Basudevpur, Joargori, Khalisani, Raghudevpur, Tehatta-Kantaberia I, Tehatta-Kantaberia II and Tulsiberia.

== Demographics ==
=== Overview ===
Rural population is 49.63% of the total population of Howrah district as per 2001 census. Scheduled castes account for 15.41% of the population, scheduled tribes 0.44% and Muslims 24.4% of the population. As the economy is prevalently industrial, majority of the population depends on industries for a living. Only 30% of the population is engaged in cultivation.

BPL families in CD Blocks
of Howrah district
Howrah Sadar subdivision
Bally Jagachha – 4.35%
Domjur – 7.21%
Panchla – 1.82%
Sankrail – 5.67%
Jagatballavpur – 10.35%
Uluberia subdivision
Uluberia I – 23.38%
Uluberia II – 19.76%
Amta I – 16.07%
Amta II – 16.38%
Udaynarayanpur – 14.12%
Bagnan I – 18.87%
Bagnan II – 21.18%
Shyampur I – 36.51%
Shyampur II – 17.85%
Source: Rural Household
Survey 2005

=== Population ===
As per 2011 Census of India Uluberia II CD Block had a total population of 191,599, of which 80,793 were rural and 110,806 were uban. There were 97,844 (51%) males and 93,755 (49%) females. Population below 6 years was 25,648. Scheduled Castes numbered 57,671 and Scheduled Tribes numbered 80.

As per 2001 census, Uluberia II block had a total population of 161,833, out of which 83,662 were males and 78,171 were females. Uluberia II block registered a population growth of 1.92 per cent during the 1991-2001 decade. Decadal growth for Howrah district was 12.76 per cent. Decadal growth in West Bengal was 17.84 per cent. Scheduled castes at 49,552 formed around one-third the population. Scheduled tribes numbered 690.

=== Census Towns and large villages ===
Census Towns in Uluberia II CD Block (2011 census figures in brackets): Baniban Jagadishpur (7,402), Kantaberia (11,507), Tehatta (12,770), Basudebpur (13,091), Raghudebpur (7,081), Santoshpur (7,695), Ghosal Chak (5,681), Balaram Pota (5,544), Khalisani (12,970), Brindabanpur (12,583), Uttar Pirpur (5,868), Baniban (6,597) and Mahishrekha (2,017).

The following Municipalities and Census Towns in Howrah district were part of Kolkata Urban Agglomeration in 2011 census: Howrah (Municipal Corporation), Bally (Municipality), Bally (Census Town), Jagadishpur (CT), Chamrail (CT), Eksara (CT), Chakapara (CT) Khalia (CT), Jaypur Bil (CT), (all, except Howrah municipal corporation and Bally municipality, in Bally Jagachha CD Block), Bankra (CT), Nibra (CT), Mahiari (CT), Bipra Noapara (CT), Ankurhati (CT), Kantlia (CT), Salap (CT), Tentulkuli (CT), Domjur (CT), Dakshin Jhapardaha (CT), Makardaha (CT), Khantora (CT), Bhandardaha (CT), (all in Domjur CD Block), Kamranga (CT), Argari (CT), Andul (CT), Ramchandrapur (CT), Jhorhat (CT), Hatgachha (CT), Dhuilya (CT), Panchpara (CT), Podara (CT), Banupur (CT), Sankrail (CT), Manikpur (CT), Sarenga (CT), Raghudebbati (CT) Nalpur (CT), Chak Srikrishna (Out Growth), (all in Sankrail CD Block), Uluberia (M) Khalisani (CT) Uttar Pirpur (CT) Balaram Pota (CT), Santoshpur (CT) (all except Uluberia municipality in Uluberia II CD Block).

Large villages in Uluberia II CD Block (2011 census figures in brackets): Tulsiberia (6,729), Abhirampur (4,584), Joargor (6,294), Kamala Chak (5,939), Karather (6,729), Surikhali (4,158) and Dasbhanga (4,266).

=== Literacy ===
As per 2011 census the total number of literates in Uluberia II CD Block was 129,528 (78.05% of the population over 6 years) out of which 70,052 (54%) were males and 59,476 (46%) were females.

As per 2011 census, literacy in Howrah district was 78.66%. Literacy in West Bengal was 77.08% in 2011. Literacy in India in 2011 was 74.04%.

As per 2001 census, Uluberia II block had a total literacy of 68.60 per cent for the 6+ age group. While male literacy was 76.28 per cent female literacy was 60.38 per cent. Howrah district had a total literacy of 77.01 per cent, male literacy being 83.22 per cent and female literacy being 70.11 per cent.

Literacy in CD blocks of
Howrah district
Howrah Sadar subdivision
Bally Jagachha – 87.75%
Domjur – 81.33%
Panchla – 78.98%
Sankrail – 83.11%
Jagatballavpur – 79.22%
Uluberia subdivision
Uluberia I – 77.39%
Uluberia II – 78.05%
Amta I – 81.26%
Amta II – 81.47%
Udaynarayanpur – 81.05%
Bagnan I – 84.09%
Bagnan II – 82.57%
Shyampur I – 78.96%
Shyampur II – 80.49%
Source: 2011 Census: CD Block Wise
Primary Census Abstract Data

=== Religion and language ===
Religion in Uluberia II CD block (2011)
Hinduism	60.51%
Islam	39.36%
Other or not stated	0.13%

In 2011 census Hindus numbered 115,932 and formed 60.51% of the population in Uluberia II CD Block. Muslims numbered 75,409 and formed 39.36% of the population. Others numbered 258 and formed 0.13% of the population.

In 2011, Hindus numbered 3,535,844 and formed 72.90% of the population in Howrah district. Muslims numbered 1,270,641 and formed 26.20% of the population. In West Bengal Hindus numbered 64,385,546 and formed 70.53% of the population. Muslims numbered 24,654,825 and formed 27.01% of the population.

Bengali is the predominant language, spoken by 99.83% of the population.

== Economy ==
=== Infrastructure ===
Up to 2003-04, Uluberia II CD Block had 245 hectares of vested land, out of which 104 hectares were distributed amongst 1,204 persons. In Uluberia II CD Block more than one crop was grown in 1,999 hectares. Net area sown in the block was 4,886 hectares. Uluberia II had 3,000 hectares of canals for irrigation. In Uluberia II CD Block 32 mouzas were electrified up to March 2004.

== Education ==
In 2003-04, Uluberia II CD Block had 96 primary schools with 17,059 students, 3 middle schools with 624 students, 8 high schools with 5,800 students and 4 higher secondary schools with 4,877 students. Uluberia II CD Block had 1 professional and technical institution with 174 students. Uluberia II CD Block had 225 institutions with 30,936 students for special and non-formal education. It had 1 mass literacy centre.

== Healthcare ==
Uluberia II CD Block had 3 health centres, 3 clinics, 1 dispensary and 1 hospital with 76 beds and 10 doctors in 2003. It had 24 family welfare centres.
