= Naupala =

- Census Town
- Location in West Bengal, India Naupala (India)
- Coordinates: 22.44234°N 87.90219°E
- Country: India
- State: West Bengal
- District: Howrah

Population (2011)
  - Total: 7,856

Languages
  - Official: Bengali, English
- Time zone: UTC+5:30 (IST)
- Vehicle registration: WB
- Website: wb.gov.in

Naupala is a census town in Bagnan II CD Block of Uluberia subdivision in Howrah district in the Indian state of West Bengal.

== Geography ==
Naupala is located at 22°26′32″N 87°54′08″E. It lies on the right bank of the Rupnarayan River.

== Demographics ==
As per 2011 Census of India Naupala had a total population of 7,856 of which 4,035 (51%) were males and 3,821 (49%) were females. Population below 6 years was 959. The total number of literates in Naupala was 5,273 (76.45% of the population over 6 years).

As of 2001 India census, Naupala had a population of 7,123. Males constitute 53% of the population and females 47%. Naupala has an average literacy rate of 61%, higher than the national average of 59.5%: male literacy is 67%, and female literacy is 54%. In Naupala, 13% of the population is under 6 years of age.

== Transport ==
It is on NH 6.
