= Madhyakul, Howrah =

Coordinates: 22.539499°N 88.043194°E

Madhyakul is a small village in Howrah district, West Bengal, India. It is approximately 7 km from Amta.
