= Bainan =

Indian village

Hatanakhya Mahadev mandir and bazaar complex, Bainan.

Bainan is a village on the bank of river Damodar in the district of Howrah in the state of West Bengal in India. It has a panchayat. It falls under Amta constituency. It has two high schools, Bainan Bamandas High School and Bainan Girls High School. It has one market which opens daily. The local Police station is "Bagnan Thana".

== Festivals ==
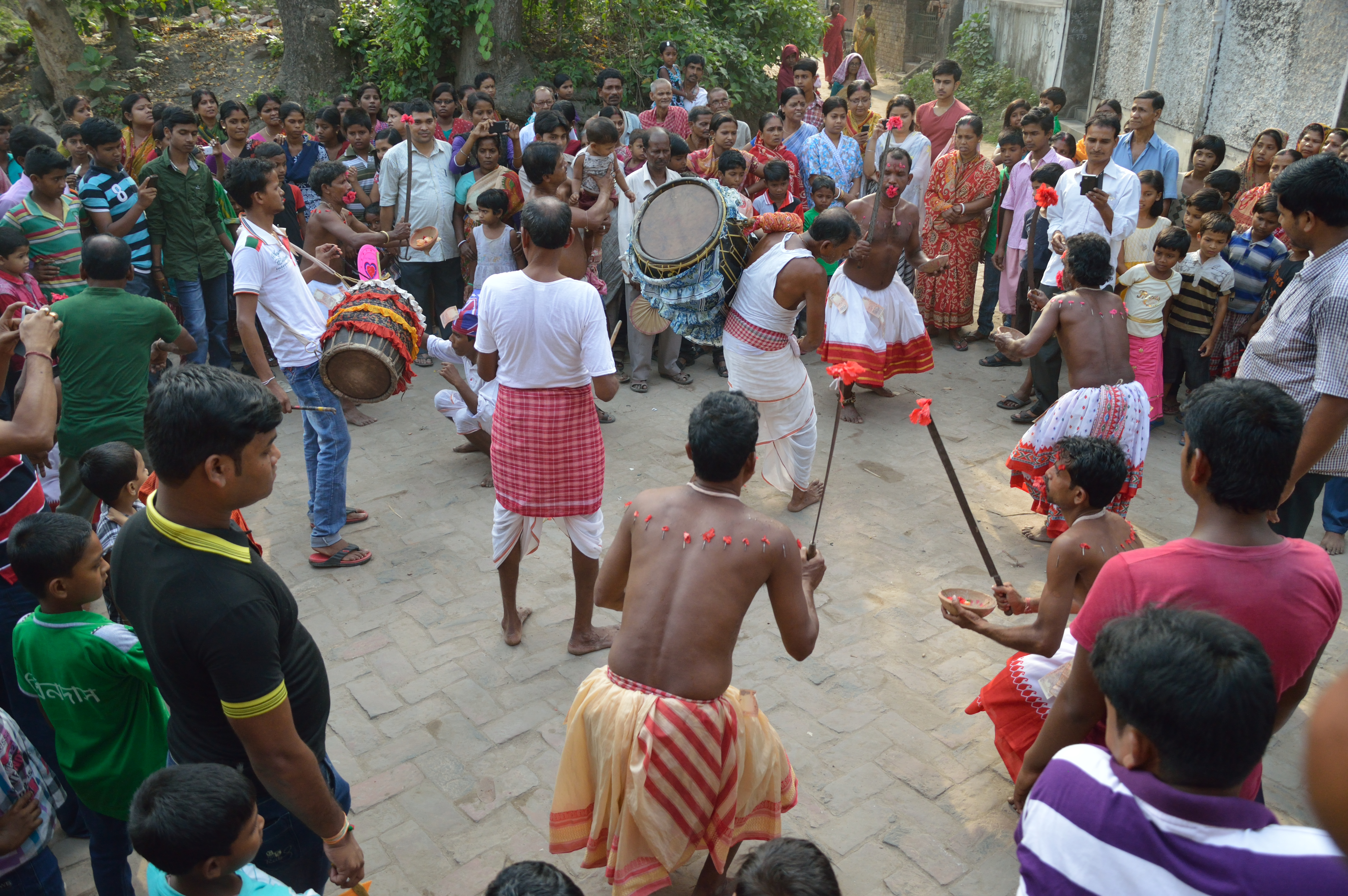
Dancing body pierced Gajan sannyasis at Bainan

Kalipujo (worship of goddess Kali) in the month of Chaitra is the most famous. In the same month Gajan is celebrated which is for god Shiva. During the month of September–October all the natives celebrate Durgapuja, which is the greatest festival of Bengal. Mainly three "Puja mandaps" are need to be mentioned here: Sashtitala, Bainan Bazar and Raypara. Although the budgets are low but you can find the true essence of celebration. Rathayatra of god Radhaballabh (radha krisha) of Ray/Bandopadhay family is celebrated in the month of Ashad (June–July) for approximately 500 years. Another very old Puja is celebrated during the month of Boisakh in Purbo Bainan Roy Para i.e. Bramha Puja. In this village only Sabyasachi Banerjee's family celebrate their own DURGA puja.
