= Barunda =

- Census Town
- Location in West Bengal, India
- Coordinates: 22°27′20.93″N 87°55′12.09″E
- Country: India
- State: West Bengal
- District: Howrah

Population (2011)
  - Total: 7,534

Languages
  - Official: Bengali, English
- Time zone: UTC+5:30 (IST)
- PIN: 711303
- Lok Sabha constituency: Uluberia
- Vidhan Sabha constituency: Bagnan
- MLA: Arunava Sen (Raja)
- Website: howrah.gov.in

Barunda is a census town in Bagnan II CD Block of Uluberia subdivision in Howrah district in the Indian state of West Bengal.

== Route ==
=== Nearest rail station ===
- Ghoraghata Rail Station

=== Nearest bus stop ===
- Nabasan Bus Stand

== Places of interest ==
=== High schools ===
- Ananda Niketan Vidyamandir, the only high school in this town

=== Primary schools ===
- Ghoraghata Primary School
- Pipulyan Primary School
- Nabasan Nimno Buniyadi School
