= Jagatballavpur (community development block) =

- Community development block

- Location within West Bengal
- Coordinates: 22°40′44″N 88°07′02″E
- Country: India
- State: West Bengal
- District: Howrah
- Parliamentary constituency: Sreerampur, Howrah
- Assembly constituency: Jagatballavpur, Panchla

Area
  - Total: 48.22 sq mi (124.89 km^{2})
- Elevation: 26 ft (8 m)

Population (2011)
  - Total: 257,941
  - Density: 5,349.2/sq mi (2,065.3/km^{2})
- Time zone: UTC+5.30 (IST)
- PIN: 711408 (Jagatballavpur); 711415 (Patihal); 711404 (Bargachia); 711410 (Munshirhat)
- Area code: 03214
- Vehicle registration: WB-11, WB-12, WB-13, WB-14
- Literacy Rate: 79.22 per cent
- Website: http://howrah.gov.in/

Jagatballavpur is a community development block that forms an administrative division in Howrah Sadar subdivision of Howrah district in the Indian state of West Bengal.

== Geography ==
Map of Howrah District

=== Location ===
Jagatballavpur is located at 22°40′44″N 88°07′02″E

Jagatballavpur CD Block is bounded by Jangipara CD Block, in Hooghly district, in the north, Domjur and Panchla CD Blocks in the east and south and Amta I CD Block in the west.

It is located 26 km from Howrah, the district headquarters.

=== Area and administration ===
Jagatballavpur CD Block has an area of 124.89 km^{2}. Jagatballavpur Police Station serves this CD Block. Jagatballavpur panchayat samity has 14 gram panchayats. The block has 75 inhabited villages. Headquarters of this block is at Munsirhat.

=== Topography ===
Howrah district is located on the west bank of the Hooghly. The Rupnarayan flows on the west and south of the district and the Damodar intersects it. The district consists of a flat alluvial plain.

=== Gram panchayats ===
Gram panchayats of Jagatballavpur block/panchayat samiti are: Baragachhia I, Baragachhia II, Gobindapur, Hantal Anantabati, Islampur, Jagatballavpur I, Jagatballavpur II, Laskarpur, Maju, Pantihal, Polegustia, Shankarhati I, Shankarhati II, and Shialdanga.

== Demographics ==
=== Overview ===
Rural population is 49.63% of the total population of Howrah district as per 2001 census. Scheduled castes account for 15.41% of the population, scheduled tribes 0.44% and Muslims 24.4% of the population. As the economy is prevalently industrial, majority of the population depends on industries for a living. Only 30% of the population is engaged in cultivation.

BPL families in CD Blocks
of Howrah district
Howrah Sadar subdivision
Bally Jagachha – 4.35%
Domjur – 7.21%
Panchla – 1.82%
Sankrail – 5.67%
Jagatballavpur – 10.35%
Uluberia subdivision
Uluberia I – 23.38%
Uluberia II – 19.76%
Amta I – 16.07%
Amta II – 16.38%
Udaynarayanpur – 14.12%
Bagnan I – 18.87%
Bagnan II – 21.18%
Shyampur I – 36.51%
Shyampur II – 17.85%
Source: Rural Household
Survey 2005

=== Population ===
As per 2011 Census of India Jagatballavpur CD Block had a total population of 257,941, of which 186,698 were rural and 71,243 were uban. There were 132,180 (51%) males and 125,761 (49%) females. Population below 6 years was 29,894. Scheduled Castes numbered 56,804 and Scheduled Tribes numbered 2,677.

As per 2001 census, Jagatballavpur block had a total population of 225166, out of which 114,050 were males and 111,116 were females. Jagatballavpur block registered a population growth of 14.05 per cent during the 1991-2001 decade. Decadal growth for Howrah district was 12.76 per cent. Scheduled castes at 52,400 formed around one-fourth the population. Scheduled tribes numbered 3,657. Decadal growth in West Bengal was 17.84 per cent.

=== Census Towns and large villages ===
Census Towns in Jagatballavpur CD Block (2011 census figures in brackets): Jagatballavpur (7,113), Kamalapur (3,348), Bankul (6,779), Mansinhapur (6,004), Bargachia (4,872), Dakshin Santoshpur (10,600), Patihal (13,573), Anantabati (9,171), Chong Ghurali (4,596) and Ekabbarpur (5,187).

Large villages in Jagatballavpur CD Block (2011 census figures in brackets): Ichhanagari (4,474), Bamunpara (5,346), Narendrapur (7,416), Madhya Santoshpur (4,738), Sial Danga (5,673), Boharia (4,035), Siddheshwar (4,760), Laskarpur (8,489), Gobindapur (11,665), Nalda (4,161), Dwipa (4,585), Pulgusti (5,780) and Islampur (7,813).

=== Literacy ===
As per 2011 census the total number of literates in Jagatballavpur CD Block was 180,664 (79.22% of the population over 6 years) out of which 97,924 (54%) were males and 82,740 (46%) were females.

As per 2011 census, literacy in Howrah district was 78.66%. Literacy in West Bengal was 77.08% in 2011. Literacy in India in 2011 was 74.04%.

As per 2001 census, Jagatballavpur block had a total literacy of 71.58 per cent for the 6+ age group. While male literacy was 79.34 per cent female literacy was 63.60 per cent. Howrah district had a total literacy of 77.01 per cent, male literacy being 83.22 per cent and female literacy being 70.11 per cent.

Literacy in CD blocks of
Howrah district
Howrah Sadar subdivision
Bally Jagachha – 87.75%
Domjur – 81.33%
Panchla – 78.98%
Sankrail – 83.11%
Jagatballavpur – 79.22%
Uluberia subdivision
Uluberia I – 77.39%
Uluberia II – 78.05%
Amta I – 81.26%
Amta II – 81.47%
Udaynarayanpur – 81.05%
Bagnan I – 84.09%
Bagnan II – 82.57%
Shyampur I – 78.96%
Shyampur II – 80.49%
Source: 2011 Census: CD Block Wise
Primary Census Abstract Data

=== Religion and language ===
Religion in Jagatballavpur CD block (2011)
Hinduism	69.36%
Islam	29.38%
Other or not stated	1.26%

In 2011 census Hindus numbered 178,915 and formed 69.36% of the population in Jagatballavpur CD Block. Muslims numbered 49,867 and formed 29.38% of the population. Others numbered 3,254 and formed 1.26% of the population.

In 2011, Hindus numbered 3,535,844 and formed 72.90% of the population in Howrah district. Muslims numbered 1,270,641 and formed 26.20% of the population. In West Bengal Hindus numbered 64,385,546 and formed 70.53% of the population. Muslims numbered 24,654,825 and formed 27.01% of the population.

Bengali is the predominant language, spoken by 99.16% of the population.

== Economy ==
=== Infrastructure ===
Prior to 2003-04, Jagatballavpur CD Block had 211 hectares of vested land, out of which 151 hectares were distributed amongst 2,625 persons. In Jagatballavpur CD Block more than one crop was grown in 7,372 hectares. Net area sown in the block was 7,969 hectares. Jagatballavpur had 2,700 hectares of canals for irrigation. In Jagatballavpur CD Block 76 mouzas were electrified up to March 2004.

== Transport ==
Jagatballavpur is connected to Howrah by rail through the Bargachia railway station of South Eastern Railway of Kharagpur division. Earlier railway was connected to here, later it was connected to Amta in the year 2000 by then Railway Minister Mamata Banerjee, via Patihal, Munsirhat, Mahendralal Nagar, Maju and Haridaspur. The rail track to Amta is of single electrified line, but railways run nearly 10 to 12 services daily in all. There will be another rail line to Tarakeswar, via Jangipara and Champadanga. These two routes were sanctioned by Railway Ministry in year 1971, but the later route is still not constructed.

== Communication ==
Jagatballavpur area exchange with code 3214 serves: Ajodhya, Amta, Bagnan, Bakshirhat, Chitrasenpur, Gangadharpur, Jagatballavpur, Kalyanpur, Kanpur-Puras, Panchla, Shyampur and Udaynarayanpur.

== Education ==
In 2003-04, Jagatballavpur CD Block had 142 primary schools with 22,154 students, 4 middle schools with 616 students, 15 high schools with 12,673 students and 6 higher secondary schools with 6,231 students. Jagatballavpur CD Block had 1 general college with 991 students and 1 technical institution with 174 students. Jagatballavpur CD Block had 240 institutions with 32,404 students for special and non-formal education. It had 2 mass literacy centres.

== Healthcare ==
Jagatballavpur CD Block had 6 health centres, 4 clinics, 4 dispensaries and 1 hospital with 108 beds and 13 doctors in 2003. It had 35 family welfare centres.
