= Uluberia I =

- Community development block
- Location in West Bengal
- Coordinates: 22°26′19″N 88°05′26″E
- Country: India
- State: West Bengal
- District: Howrah
- Parliamentary constituency: Uluberia
- Assembly constituency: Uluberia Dakshin

Area
  - Total: 44.16 sq mi (114.38 km^{2})
- Elevation: 33 ft (10 m)

Population (2011)
  - Total: 215,392
  - Density: 4,877.3/sq mi (1,883.1/km^{2})
- Time zone: UTC+5.30 (IST)
- PIN: 711315 (Uluberia)
- Area code: 03214
- Vehicle registration: WB-11, WB-12, WB-13, WB-14
- Literacy Rate: 77.39 per cent
- Website: http://howrah.gov.in/

Uluberia I is a community development block that forms an administrative division in Uluberia subdivision of Howrah district in the Indian state of West Bengal.

== Geography ==
Map of Howrah District

=== Location ===
Tapna Gram Panchayat (Purba Tapna Horkole), a constituent panchayat of Uluberia I block, is located at 22°26′19″N 88°05′26″E

Uluberia I CD Block is bounded by Uluberia II, Panchla and Sankrail CD Blocks in the north, Budge Budge I and Budge Budge II CD Blocks in South 24 Parganas district, across the Hooghly in the east, Shyampur I CD Block in the south and Shyampur II, Bagnan II and Bagnan I CD Blocks in the west.

It is located 28 km from Howrah, the district headquarters.

=== Area and administration ===
Uluberia I CD Block has an area of 114.38 km^{2}.Uluberia police station serves this CD Block. Uluberia I panchayat samity has 9 gram panchayats. The block has 71 inhabited villages. Headquarters of this block is at Uluberia.

=== Topography ===
Howrah district is located on the west bank of the Hooghly. The Rupnarayan flows on the west and south of the district and the Damodar intersects it. The district consists of a flat alluvial plain.

=== Gram panchayats ===
Gram panchayats of Uluberia I block/panchayat samiti are: Bahira, Chandipur, Dhulasimla, Hatgachha I, Hatgachha II, Heerapur, Kalinagar, Maheshpur, and Tapna.

== Demographics ==
=== Overview ===
Rural population is 49.63% of the total population of Howrah district as per 2001 census. Scheduled castes account for 15.41% of the population, scheduled tribes 0.44% and Muslims 24.4% of the population. As the economy is prevalently industrial, majority of the population depends on industries for a living. Only 30% of the population is engaged in cultivation.

BPL families in CD Blocks
of Howrah district
Howrah Sadar subdivision
Bally Jagachha – 4.35%
Domjur – 7.21%
Panchla – 1.82%
Sankrail – 5.67%
Jagatballavpur – 10.35%
Uluberia subdivision
Uluberia I – 23.38%
Uluberia II – 19.76%
Amta I – 16.07%
Amta II – 16.38%
Udaynarayanpur – 14.12%
Bagnan I – 18.87%
Bagnan II – 21.18%
Shyampur I – 36.51%
Shyampur II – 17.85%
Source: Rural Household
Survey 2005

=== Population ===
As per 2011 Census of India Uluberia I CD Block had a total population of 215,392, of which 184,781 were rural and 30,611 were uban. There were 109,809 (51%) males and 195,583 (49%) females. Population below 6 years was 29,413. Scheduled Castes numbered 47,471 and Scheduled Tribes numbered 157.

As per 2001 census, Uluberia I block had a total population of 182,085, out of which 92,817 were males and 89,268 were females. Uluberia I block registered a population growth of 18.35 per cent during the 1991-2001 decade. Decadal growth for Howrah district was 12.76 per cent. Decadal growth in West Bengal was 17.84 per cent. Scheduled castes at 45,974 formed around one-fourth the population. Scheduled tribes numbered 1,587.

=== Census Towns and large villages ===
Census Towns in Uluberia I CD Block (2011 census figures in brackets): Chandipur (6,488), Kaijuri (5,932), Alipukur (5,552), Dhulasimla (5,462) and Hirapur (7,177).

Large villages in Uluberia I CD Block (2011 census figures in brackets): Jaynagar (4,033), Beraberia (4,404), Rangmahal (4,986), Kashmul (4,626), Baragohal (4,045), Mahespur (4,632), Tapna (6,182), Maubesia (4,801), Bahira (7,845), Mahisali (5,201) and Kalinagar (11,358).

=== Literacy ===
As per 2011 census the total number of literates in Uluberia I CD Block was 143,933 (77.39% of the population over 6 years) out of which 77,603 (54%) were males and 66,330 (46%) were females.

As per 2011 census, literacy in Howrah district was 78.66%. Literacy in West Bengal was 77.08% in 2011. Literacy in India in 2011 was 74.04%.

As per 2001 census, Uluberia I block had a total literacy of 68.61 per cent for the 6+ age group. While male literacy was 76.36 per cent female literacy was 60.56 per cent. Howrah district had a total literacy of 77.01 per cent, male literacy being 83.22 per cent and female literacy being 70.11 per cent.

Literacy in CD blocks of
Howrah district
Howrah Sadar subdivision
Bally Jagachha – 87.75%
Domjur – 81.33%
Panchla – 78.98%
Sankrail – 83.11%
Jagatballavpur – 79.22%
Uluberia subdivision
Uluberia I – 77.39%
Uluberia II – 78.05%
Amta I – 81.26%
Amta II – 81.47%
Udaynarayanpur – 81.05%
Bagnan I – 84.09%
Bagnan II – 82.57%
Shyampur I – 78.96%
Shyampur II – 80.49%
Source: 2011 Census: CD Block Wise
Primary Census Abstract Data

=== Religion and language ===
Religion in Uluberia I CD block (2011)
Hinduism	55.90%
Islam	43.92%
Other or not stated	0.18%

In 2011 census Hindus numbered 120,409 and formed 55.90% of the population in Uluberia I CD Block. Muslims numbered 94,607 and formed 43.92% of the population. Others numbered 376 and formed 0.18% of the population.

In 2011, Hindus numbered 3,535,844 and formed 72.90% of the population in Howrah district. Muslims numbered 1,270,641 and formed 26.20% of the population. In West Bengal Hindus numbered 64,385,546 and formed 70.53% of the population. Muslims numbered 24,654,825 and formed 27.01% of the population.

Bengali is the predominant language, spoken by 99.79% of the population.

== Economy ==
=== Infrastructure ===
Up to 2003-04, Uluberia I CD Block had 346 hectares of vested land, out of which 229 hectares were distributed amongst 1,482 persons. In Uluberia I CD Block more than one crop was grown in 2,427 hectares. Net area sown in the block was 7,220 hectares. Uluberia I had 2,000 hectares of canals for irrigation. In Uluberia I CD Block 71 mouzas were electrified up to March 2004.

== Education ==
In 2003-04, Uluberia I CD Block had 114 primary schools with 19,901 students, 4 middle schools with 1,076 students, 10 high schools with 6,726 students and 6 higher secondary schools with 3,900 students. Uluberia CD Block had 188 institutions with 24,962 students for special and non-formal education. It had 1 mass literacy centre.

== Healthcare ==
Uluberia I CD Block had 3 health centres and 1 clinic with 18 beds and 5 doctors in 2003. It had 26 family welfare centres.
