= Amta II =

- Community development block
- Location in West Bengal
- Coordinates: 22°35′27″N 87°55′39″E
- Country: India
- State: West Bengal
- District: Howrah
- Parliamentary constituency: Uluberia
- Assembly constituency: Amta

Area
  - Total: 52.29 sq mi (135.42 km^{2})
- Elevation: 20 ft (6 m)

Population (2011)
  - Total: 208,132
  - Density: 3,980.6/sq mi (1,536.9/km^{2})
- Time zone: UTC+5.30 (IST)
- PIN: 711413 (Gazipur)
- Area code: 03214
- Vehicle registration: WB-11, WB-12, WB-13, WB-14
- Literacy Rate: 81.47 per cent
- Website: http://www.amta2bdo.in/

Amta II is a community development block that forms an administrative division in Uluberia subdivision of Howrah district in the Indian state of West Bengal.

== Geography ==
Map of Howrah District

=== Location ===
Jaypur, a constituent panchayat of Amta II block, is located at 22°35′27″N 87°55′39″E

Amta II CD Block is bounded by Udaynarayanpur CD Block and Khanakul II CD Block, in Hooghly district, in the north, Amta I CD Block in the east, Bagnan I CD Block in the south and Daspur II CD Block, in Paschim Medinipur district, in the west.

It is located 36 km from Howrah, the district headquarters.

=== Area and administration ===
Amta II CD Block has an area of 135.42 km^{2}. Amta police station serves this CD Block. Amta II panchayat samity has 14 gram panchayats. The block has 68 inhabited villages. Headquarters of this block is at Jaypur Fakirdas.

=== Topography ===
Howrah district is located on the west bank of the Hooghly. The Rupnarayan flows on the west and south of the district and the Damodar intersects it. The district consists of a flat alluvial plain.

=== Gram panchayats ===
Gram panchayats of Amta II block/panchayat samiti are: Amragori, Ghoraberia Chitnan, Khalna, Tajpur, Bhatora, Jhamtia, Kasmoli, Thalia, Binola Krishnabati, Jaypur, Kusberia, Gazipur, Jhikhira and Noyapara.

== Demographics ==
=== Overview ===
Rural population is 49.63% of the total population of Howrah district as per 2001 census. Scheduled castes account for 15.41% of the population, scheduled tribes 0.44% and Muslims 24.4% of the population. As the economy is prevalently industrial, the majority of the population depends on industries for a living. Only 30% of the population is engaged in cultivation.

BPL families in CD Blocks
of Howrah district
Howrah Sadar subdivision
Bally Jagachha – 4.35%
Domjur – 7.21%
Panchla – 1.82%
Sankrail – 5.67%
Jagatballavpur – 10.35%
Uluberia subdivision
Uluberia I – 23.38%
Uluberia II – 19.76%
Amta I – 16.07%
Amta II – 16.38%
Udaynarayanpur – 14.12%
Bagnan I – 18.87%
Bagnan II – 21.18%
Shyampur I – 36.51%
Shyampur II – 17.85%
Source: Rural Household
Survey 2005

=== Population ===
As per 2011 Census of India Amta II CD Block had a total population of 208,132, of which 192,298 were rural and 15,834 were uban. There were 107,083 (51%) males and 101,049 (49%) females. Population below 6 years was 23,799. Scheduled Castes numbered 50,768 and Scheduled Tribes numbered 282.

As per 2001 census, Amta II block had a total population of 189,224, out of which 97,618 were males and 91,606 were females. Amta II block registered a population growth of 8.55 per cent during the 1991-2001 decade. Decadal growth for Howrah district was 12.76 per cent. Decadal growth in West Bengal was 17.84 per cent. Scheduled castes at 49,321 formed around one-fourth the population. Scheduled tribes numbered 1,014.

=== Census towns and large villages ===
Census Towns in Amta II CD Block (2011 census figures in brackets): Ghoraberia (4,612), Paschim Gazipur (5,409) and Paschim Khalna (5,813).

Large villages in Amta II CD Block (2011 census figures in brackets): Nakubar (4,453), Jhikhira (5,421), Chingrajola (4,974), Kakrol (5,258), Uttar Bhatora (5,370), Dakshin Bhatora (8,854), Chitnan (4,757), Dakshin Khalna (5,701), Jhamtia (4,879), Kasmali (4,662), Jaypur (9,023), Khariop (4,806), Nawapara (5,815), Kusberia (4,223), Sarda (5,677) and Tajpur (6,806).

=== Literacy ===
As per 2011 census the total number of literates in Amta II CD Block was 150,178 (81.47% of the population over 6 years) out of which 82,341 (55%) were males and 67,837 (45%) were females.

As per 2011 census, literacy in Howrah district was 78.66%. Literacy in West Bengal was 77.08% in 2011. Literacy in India in 2011 was 74.04%.

As per 2001 census, Amta II block had a total literacy of 74.08 per cent for the 6+ age group. While male literacy was 82.78 per cent female literacy was 64.78 per cent. Howrah district had a total literacy of 77.01 per cent, male literacy being 83.22 per cent and female literacy being 70.11 per cent.

Literacy in CD blocks of
Howrah district
Howrah Sadar subdivision
Bally Jagachha – 87.75%
Domjur – 81.33%
Panchla – 78.98%
Sankrail – 83.11%
Jagatballavpur – 79.22%
Uluberia subdivision
Uluberia I – 77.39%
Uluberia II – 78.05%
Amta I – 81.26%
Amta II – 81.47%
Udaynarayanpur – 81.05%
Bagnan I – 84.09%
Bagnan II – 82.57%
Shyampur I – 78.96%
Shyampur II – 80.49%
Source: 2011 Census: CD Block Wise
Primary Census Abstract Data

=== Religion and language ===
Religion in Amta II CD block (2011)
Hinduism	75.70%
Islam	23.96%
Other or not stated	0.34%

In 2011 census Hindus numbered 157,566 and formed 75.70% of the population in Amta II CD Block. Muslims numbered 49,867 and formed 23.96% of the population. Others numbered 699 and formed 0.34% of the population.

In 2011, Hindus numbered 3,535,844 and formed 72.90% of the population in Howrah district. Muslims numbered 1,270,641 and formed 26.20% of the population. In West Bengal Hindus numbered 64,385,546 and formed 70.53% of the population. Muslims numbered 24,654,825 and formed 27.01% of the population.

Bengali is the predominant language, spoken by 99.82% of the population.

== Economy ==
=== Infrastructure ===
Prior to 2003-04, Amta II CD Block had 637 hectares of vested land, out of which 277 hectares were distributed amongst 3,280 persons. In Amta II CD Block more than one crop was grown in 5,645 hectares. Net area sown in the block was 10,493 hectares. Amta II had 2,000 hectares of canals for irrigation. In Amta II CD Block 69 mouzas were electrified up to March 2004.

== Education ==
In 2003-04, Amta II CD Block had 149 primary schools with 19,114 students, 3 middle schools with 455 students, 18 high schools with 12,872 students and 5 higher secondary schools with 5,269 students. Amta II CD Block had 1 colleges with 544 students. Amta II CD Block had 150 institutions with 21,316 students for special and non-formal education. It had 2 mass literacy centres.

== Healthcare ==
Amta II CD Block had 5 health centres, 1 clinic and 1 hospital with 87 beds and 13 doctors in 2003. It had 25 family welfare centres.
