= Udaynarayanpur =

- Community development block
- Location in West Bengal
- Coordinates: 22°43′01″N 87°58′30″E
- Country: India
- State: West Bengal
- District: Howrah
- Parliamentary constituency: Uluberia
- Assembly constituency: Udaynarayanpur

Area
  - Total: 48.19 sq mi (124.80 km^{2})
- Elevation: 23 ft (7 m)

Population (2011)
  - Total: 190,186
  - Density: 3,947.0/sq mi (1,523.9/km^{2})
- Time zone: UTC+5.30 (IST)
- PIN: 711226 (Udaynarayanpur)
- Area code: 03214
- Vehicle registration: WB-11, WB-12, WB-13, WB-14
- Literacy Rate: 81.05 per cent
- Website: http://howrah.gov.in/

Udaynarayanpur is a community development block that forms an administrative division in Uluberia subdivision of Howrah district in the Indian state of West Bengal.

== Geography ==
Map of Howrah District

=== Location ===
Udaynarayanpur is located at 22°43′01″N 87°58′30″E.

Udaynarayanpur CD Block is bounded by Pursurah CD Block, in Hooghly district, in the north, Jangipara CD Block, in Hooghly district, in the east, Amta I and Amta II CD Blocks in the south and Khanakul I and Khanakul II CD Blocks, in Hooghly district, in the west.

It is located 43 km from Howrah, the district headquarters.

=== Area and administration ===
Udaynarayanpur CD Block has an area of 124.80 km^{2}. Udaynarayanpur police station serves this CD Block. Udaynarayanpur panchayat samity has 11 gram panchayats. The block has 75 inhabited villages. Headquarters of this block is at Udaynarayanpur.

=== Topography ===
Howrah district is located on the west bank of the Hooghly. The Rupnarayan flows on the west and south of the district and the Damodar intersects it. The district consists of a flat alluvial plain.

=== Gram panchayats ===
Gram panchayats of Udaynayanpur block/panchayat samiti are: Bhabanipur Bidhichandrapur, Harali Udaynarayanpur, Khila, Rampur-Dihibhursut Asanda, Kurchi Shibpur, Debipur, Harishpur, Garbhabanipur-Sonatala, Kanupat Mansuka, Pancharul, Singti

== Demographics ==
=== Overview ===
Rural population is 49.63% of the total population of Howrah district as per 2001 census. Scheduled castes account for 15.41% of the population, scheduled tribes 0.44% and Muslims 24.4% of the population. As the economy is prevalently industrial, majority of the population depends on industries for a living. Only 30% of the population is engaged in cultivation.

BPL families in CD Blocks
of Howrah district
Howrah Sadar subdivision
Bally Jagachha – 4.35%
Domjur – 7.21%
Panchla – 1.82%
Sankrail – 5.67%
Jagatballavpur – 10.35%
Uluberia subdivision
Uluberia I – 23.38%
Uluberia II – 19.76%
Amta I – 16.07%
Amta II – 16.38%
Udaynarayanpur – 14.12%
Bagnan I – 18.87%
Bagnan II – 21.18%
Shyampur I – 36.51%
Shyampur II – 17.85%
Source: Rural Household
Survey 2005

=== Population ===
As per 2011 Census of India Udaynarayanpur CD Block had a total population of 190,186, all of which were rural. There were 97,735 (51%) males and 92,451 (49%) females. Population below 6 years was 19,162. Scheduled Castes numbered 39,403 and Scheduled Tribes numbered 367.

As per 2001 census, Udaynarayanpur block had a total population of 172,080, out of which 88,481 were males and 83,669 were females. Udaynarayanpur block registered a population growth of 9.09 per cent during the 1991-2001 decade. Decadal growth for Howrah district was 12.76 per cent. Decadal growth in West Bengal was 17.84 per cent. Scheduled castes at 38,058 formed around one-fourth the population. Scheduled tribes numbered 1,794.

=== Large villages ===
Large villages in Udaynarayanpur CD Block (2011 census figures in brackets): Dihi Bhurshut (4,602), Rampur (4,765), Goja (4,203), Kurchi Binodbati (6,522), Sibpur (4,965), Pancharul (6,678), Uttar Harishpur (4,152), Uttar Manasri (5,555), Sinti (6,324), Janglapara Belgram (4,975), Sonatala (5,093), Bidhichandrapur (5,290), Peruhareshpur (5,892), Narikelberia (4,231) and Par Radhanagar (4,343).

=== Literacy ===
As per 2011 census the total number of literates in Udaynarayanpur CD Block was 138,618 (81.05% of the population over 6 years) out of which 76,012 (55%) were males and 62,206 (45%) were females.

As per 2011 census, literacy in Howrah district was 78.66%. Literacy in West Bengal was 77.08% in 2011. Literacy in India in 2011 was 74.04%.

As per 2001 census, Udaynarayanpur block had a total literacy of 74.06 per cent for the 6+ age group. While male literacy was 82.10 per cent female literacy was 65.54 per cent. Howrah district had a total literacy of 77.01 per cent, male literacy being 83.22 per cent and female literacy being 70.11 per cent.

Literacy in CD blocks of
Howrah district
Howrah Sadar subdivision
Bally Jagachha – 87.75%
Domjur – 81.33%
Panchla – 78.98%
Sankrail – 83.11%
Jagatballavpur – 79.22%
Uluberia subdivision
Uluberia I – 77.39%
Uluberia II – 78.05%
Amta I – 81.26%
Amta II – 81.47%
Udaynarayanpur – 81.05%
Bagnan I – 84.09%
Bagnan II – 82.57%
Shyampur I – 78.96%
Shyampur II – 80.49%
Source: 2011 Census: CD Block Wise
Primary Census Abstract Data

=== Religion and language ===
Religion in Udaynarayanpur CD block (2011)
Hinduism	90.75%
Islam	8.91%
Other or not stated	0.34%

In 2011 census Hindus numbered 172,598 and formed 90.75% of the population in Udaynarayanpur CD Block. Muslims numbered 16,950 and formed 8.91% of the population. Others numbered 638 and formed 0.34% of the population.

In 2011, Hindus numbered 3,535,844 and formed 72.90% of the population in Howrah district. Muslims numbered 1,270,641 and formed 26.20% of the population. In West Bengal Hindus numbered 64,385,546 and formed 70.53% of the population. Muslims numbered 24,654,825 and formed 27.01% of the population.

Bengali is the predominant language, spoken by 99.70% of the population.

== Economy ==
=== Infrastructure ===
Prior to 2003–04, Udaynarayanpur CD Block had 287 hectares of vested land, out of which 89 hectares were distributed amongst 1,864 persons. In Udaynarayanpur CD Block more than one crop was grown in 1,549 hectares. Net area sown in the block was 8,223 hectares. Udaynarayanpur had 1,500 hectares of canals for irrigation. In Udaynarayanpur CD Block 75 mouzas were electrified up to March 2004.

== Education ==
In 2003–04, Udaynarayanpur CD Block had 120 primary schools with 14,923 students, 2 middle schools with 857 students, 15 high schools with 12,068 students and 7 higher secondary schools with 7,307 students. Udaynarayanpur CD Block had 177 institutions with 19,464 student for special and non-formal education. It had 2 mass literacy centres.

== Healthcare ==
Udaynarayanpur CD Block had 5 health centres, 1 clinic, 3 dispensaries and 1 hospital with 104 beds and 20 doctors in 2003. It had 30 family welfare centres.
