= Shyampur II =

- Community development block
- Location in West Bengal
- Coordinates: 22°23′17″N 88°02′15″E
- Country: India
- State: West Bengal
- District: Howrah
- Parliamentary constituency: Uluberia
- Assembly constituency: Shyampur

Area
  - Total: 38.71 sq mi (100.25 km^{2})
- Elevation: 20 ft (6 m)

Population (2011)
  - Total: 196,164
  - Density: 5,068.0/sq mi (1,956.7/km^{2})
- Time zone: UTC+5.30 (IST)
- Area code: 03228
- Vehicle registration: WB-11, WB-12, WB-13, WB-14
- Literacy Rate: 80.49 per cent
- Website: http://howrah.gov.in/

Shyampur II is a community development block that forms an administrative division in Uluberia subdivision of Howrah district in the Indian state of West Bengal.

== Geography ==
Map of Howrah District

=== Location ===
Bargram, a constituent panchayat of Shyampur II block, is located at 22°23′17″N 88°02′15″E.

Shyampur II CD Block is bounded by Bagnan II and Uluberia I CD Blocks in the north, Shyampur I CD Block in the east and south, Sahid Matangini and Tamluk CD Blocks, in Purba Medinipur district, across the Rupnarayan, in the west.

It is located 51 km from Howrah, the district headquarters.

=== Area and administration ===
Shyampur II CD Block has an area of 100.25 km^{2}. Shyampur police station serves this CD Block. Shyampur II panchayat samity has 8 gram panchayats. The block has 76 inhabited villages. Headquarters of this block is at Shashati.

=== Topography ===
Howrah district is located on the west bank of the Hooghly. The Rupnarayan flows on the west and south of the district and the Damodar intersects it. The district consists of a flat alluvial plain.

=== Gram panchayats ===
Gram panchayats of Shyampur II block/panchayat samiti are: Amardaha, Bachhri, Bargram, Dihimondalghat I, Dihimondalghat II, Kharuberia, Nakol, and Shashati.

== Demographics ==
=== Overview ===
Rural population is 49.63% of the total population of Howrah district as per 2001 census. Scheduled castes account for 15.41% of the population, scheduled tribes 0.44% and Muslims 24.4% of the population. As the economy is prevalently industrial, a majority of the population depends on industries for a living. Only 30% of the population is engaged in cultivation.

BPL families in CD Blocks
of Howrah district
Howrah Sadar subdivision
Bally Jagachha – 4.35%
Domjur – 7.21%
Panchla – 1.82%
Sankrail – 5.67%
Jagatballavpur – 10.35%
Uluberia subdivision
Uluberia I – 23.38%
Uluberia II – 19.76%
Amta I – 16.07%
Amta II – 16.38%
Udaynarayanpur – 14.12%
Bagnan I – 18.87%
Bagnan II – 21.18%
Shyampur I – 36.51%
Shyampur II – 17.85%
Source: Rural Household
Survey 2005

=== Population ===
As per 2011 Census of India Shyampur II CD Block had a total population of 196,164, of which 175,475 were rural and 20,689 were urban. There were 100,471 (51%) males and 95,693 (49%) females. Population below 6 years was 23,221. Scheduled Castes numbered 23,055 and Scheduled Tribes numbered 109.

As per 2001 census, Shyampur II block had a total population of 171,047, out of which 86,943 were males and 84,104 were females. Shyampur II block registered a population growth of 11.57 per cent during the 1991-2001 decade. Decadal growth for Howrah district was 12.76 per cent. Decadal growth in West Bengal was 17.84 per cent. Scheduled castes at 22,809 formed around one-eighth the population. Scheduled tribes numbered 451.

=== Census Towns and large villages ===
Census Towns in Shyampur II CD Block (2011 census figures in brackets): Naul (5,865), Shashati (6,914) and Dihimandalghat (7,910).

Large villages in Shyampur II CD Block (2011 census figures in brackets): Katagachhi (4,008), Nakol (4,610), Baikunthapur (4,653), Kultikari (4,409), Chanpabar (4,075), Bargarchumbak (5,701), Bargram (5,586), Radhanagar (5,068), Anantapur (6,256), Jhumjhumi (5,500), Ajodhya (5,670), Sultanpur (4,514), Narayanpur (4,863), Gobindapur (4,814) and Jaynagar (5,169). Uttar Durgapur

=== Literacy ===
As per 2011 census the total number of literates in Shyampur II CD Block was 139,206 (80.49% of the population over 6 years) out of which 75,504 (54%) were males and 63,702 (46%) were females.

As per 2011 census, literacy in Howrah district was 78.66%. Literacy in West Bengal was 77.08% in 2011. Literacy in India in 2011 was 74.04%.

As per 2001 census, Shyampur II block had a total literacy of 75.43 per cent for the 6+ age group. While male literacy was 84.25 per cent female literacy was 66.32 per cent. Howrah district had a total literacy of 77.01 per cent, male literacy being 83.22 per cent and female literacy being 70.11 per cent.

Literacy in CD blocks of
Howrah district
Howrah Sadar subdivision
Bally Jagachha – 87.75%
Domjur – 81.33%
Panchla – 78.98%
Sankrail – 83.11%
Jagatballavpur – 79.22%
Uluberia subdivision
Uluberia I – 77.39%
Uluberia II – 78.05%
Amta I – 81.26%
Amta II – 81.47%
Udaynarayanpur – 81.05%
Bagnan I – 84.09%
Bagnan II – 82.57%
Shyampur I – 78.96%
Shyampur II – 80.49%
Source: 2011 Census: CD Block Wise
Primary Census Abstract Data

=== Religion and language ===
Religion in Shyampur II CD block (2011)
Hinduism	73.65%
Islam	25.97%
Other or not stated	0.38%

In 2011 census Hindus numbered 144,172 and formed 73.65% of the population in Shyampur II CD Block. Muslims numbered 50,945 and formed 25.97% of the population. Others numbered 747 and formed 0.38% of the population.

In 2011, Hindus numbered 3,535,844 and formed 72.90% of the population in Howrah district. Muslims numbered 1,270,641 and formed 26.20% of the population. In West Bengal Hindus numbered 64,385,546 and formed 70.53% of the population. Muslims numbered 24,654,825 and formed 27.01% of the population.

Bengali is the predominant language, spoken by 99.74% of the population.

== Economy ==
=== Infrastructure ===
Up to 2003–04, Shyampur II CD Block had 268 hectares of vested land, out of which 172 hectares were distributed amongst 1,566 persons. Shyampur II had 4,500 hectares of canals for irrigation. In Shyampur II CD Block 76 mouzas were electrified up to March 2004.

*Picnic Place =Garchumuk (58 Gate)
*Transport - 'Garchumuk-Bagnan Road'

== Education ==
In 2003–04, Shyampur II CD Block had 126 primary schools with 18,355 students, 3 middle schools with 1,013 students, 14 high schools with 10,438 students and 4 higher secondary schools with 5,480 students. Shyampur II had 1 general college with 1,382 students and 1 professional and technical institution with 77 students. Shyampur II CD Block had 190 institutions with 24,112 students for special and non-formal education. It had 1 mass literacy centre. Name of some famous schools - Durgapur B.A. High School (H.S.), Shyampur high school (H.S.)

== Healthcare ==
Shyampur II CD Block had 3 health centres and 4 clinics with 27 beds and 5 doctors in 2003. It had 28 family welfare centres.
