= Shyampur I =

- Community development block
- Location in West Bengal
- Coordinates: 22°16′13″N 88°02′38″E
- Country: India
- State: West Bengal
- District: Howrah
- Parliamentary constituency: Uluberia
- Assembly constituency: Shyampur, Uluberia Dakshin

Area
  - Total: 43.98 sq mi (113.92 km^{2})
- Elevation: 13 ft (4 m)

Population (2011)
  - Total: 205,849
  - Density: 4,680.0/sq mi (1,807.0/km^{2})
- Time zone: UTC+5.30 (IST)
- PIN: 711314 (Shyampur)
- Area code: 03228
- Vehicle registration: WB-11, WB-12, WB-13, WB-14
- Literacy Rate: 78.96 per cent
- Website: http://howrah.gov.in/

Shyampur I is a community development block that forms an administrative division in Uluberia subdivision of Howrah district in the Indian state of West Bengal.

== Geography ==
Map of Howrah District

=== Location ===
Radhapur, a constituent panchayat of Shyampur I block, is located at 22°16′13″N 88°02′38″E.

Shyampur I CD Block is bounded by Uluberia I CD Block in the north, Falta and Diamond Harbour II CD Blocks in South 24 Parganas district, across the Hooghly, in the east, Mahishadal and Tamluk CD Blocks, in Purba Medinipur district, across the Rupnarayan, in parts of the south and west, and Shyampur II CD Block in parts of the west and north.

It is located 52 km from Howrah, the district headquarters.

=== Area and administration ===
Shyampur I CD Block has an area of 113.92 km^{2}. Shyampur police station serves this CD Block. Shyampur I panchayat samity has 10 gram panchayats. The block has 67 inhabited villages. Headquarters of this block is at Shyampur.

=== Topography ===
Howrah district is located on the west bank of the Hooghly. The Rupnarayan flows on the west and south of the district and the Damodar intersects it. The district consists of a flat alluvial plain.

=== Gram panchayats ===
Gram panchayats of Shyampur I block/panchayat samiti are: Balichaturi, Baneswarpur I, Baneswarpur II, Belari, Dhandali, Dingakhola, Kamalpur, Nabagram, Radhapur and Shyampur.

== Demographics ==
=== Overview ===
Rural population is 49.63% of the total population of Howrah district as per 2001 census. Scheduled castes account for 15.41% of the population, scheduled tribes 0.44% and Muslims 24.4% of the population. As the economy is prevalently industrial, majority of the population depends on industries for a living. Only 30% of the population is engaged in cultivation.

BPL families in CD Blocks
of Howrah district
Howrah Sadar subdivision
Bally Jagachha – 4.35%
Domjur – 7.21%
Panchla – 1.82%
Sankrail – 5.67%
Jagatballavpur – 10.35%
Uluberia subdivision
Uluberia I – 23.38%
Uluberia II – 19.76%
Amta I – 16.07%
Amta II – 16.38%
Udaynarayanpur – 14.12%
Bagnan I – 18.87%
Bagnan II – 21.18%
Shyampur I – 36.51%
Shyampur II – 17.85%
Source: Rural Household
Survey 2005

=== Population ===
As per 2011 Census of India Shyampur I CD Block had a total population of 205,849, of which 183,220 were rural and 22,629 were urban. There were 104,715 (51%) males and 101,134 (49%) females. Population below 6 years was 22,919. Scheduled Castes numbered 37,500 and Scheduled Tribes numbered 325.

As per 2001 census, Shyampur I block had a total population of 182,333, out of which 92,921 were males and 89,412 were females. Shyampur I block registered a population growth of 14.93 per cent during the 1991-2001 decade. Decadal growth for Howrah district was 12.76 per cent. Decadal growth in West Bengal was 17.84 per cent. Scheduled castes at 34,580 formed around one-sixth the population. Scheduled tribes numbered 1,110.

=== Census Towns and large villages ===
Census Towns in Shyampur I CD Block (2011 census figures in brackets): Shyampur (7,354), Dinga Khola (5,271), Radhapur (4,623) and Jallabad (5,381).

Large villages in Shyampur I CD Block (2011 census figures in brackets): Srikol (4,465), Kotara (4,613), Deuli (6,642), Dakshin Durgapur (4,457), Baneshwarpur (4,928), Sibpur (4,499), Gurepol (7,613), Sibganja (4,764), Bhagawanpur (4,680), Gajankol (4,406), Dhandoli (6,307), Belari (4,383), Ramchandrapur (6,038) and Alipur (7,533).

=== Literacy ===
As per 2011 census the total number of literates in Shyampur I CD Block was 144,440 (78.96% of the population over 6 years) out of which 78,249 (54%) were males and 66,200 (46%) were females.

As per 2011 census, literacy in Howrah district was 78.66%. Literacy in West Bengal was 77.08% in 2011. Literacy in India in 2011 was 74.04%.

As per 2001 census, Shyampur I block had a total literacy of 72.65 per cent for the 6+ age group. While male literacy was 81.18 per cent female literacy was 63.79 per cent. Howrah district had a total literacy of 77.01 per cent, male literacy being 83.22 per cent and female literacy being 70.11 per cent.

Literacy in CD blocks of
Howrah district
Howrah Sadar subdivision
Bally Jagachha – 87.75%
Domjur – 81.33%
Panchla – 78.98%
Sankrail – 83.11%
Jagatballavpur – 79.22%
Uluberia subdivision
Uluberia I – 77.39%
Uluberia II – 78.05%
Amta I – 81.26%
Amta II – 81.47%
Udaynarayanpur – 81.05%
Bagnan I – 84.09%
Bagnan II – 82.57%
Shyampur I – 78.96%
Shyampur II – 80.49%
Source: 2011 Census: CD Block Wise
Primary Census Abstract Data

=== Religion and language ===
Religion in Shaympur I CD block (2011)
Hinduism	79.74%
Islam	20.13%
Other or not stated	0.13%

In 2011 census Hindus numbered 164,164 and formed 79.74% of the population in Shyampur I CD Block. Muslims numbered 41,428 and formed 20.13% of the population. Others numbered 257 and formed 0.13% of the population.

In 2011, Hindus numbered 3,535,844 and formed 72.90% of the population in Howrah district. Muslims numbered 1,270,641 and formed 26.20% of the population. In West Bengal Hindus numbered 64,385,546 and formed 70.53% of the population. Muslims numbered 24,654,825 and formed 27.01% of the population.

Bengali is the predominant language, spoken by 99.86% of the population.

== Economy ==
=== Infrastructure ===
Up to 2003-04, Shyampur I CD Block had 525 hectares of vested land, out of which 236 hectares were distributed amongst 3,166 persons. Shyampur I had 5,000 hectares of canals for irrigation. In Shyampur I CD Block 67 mouzas were electrified up to March 2004.

== Education ==
In 2003-04, Shyampur I CD Block had 125 primary schools with 19,338 students, 6 middle schools with 1,555 students, 12 high schools with 10,915 students and 7 higher secondary schools with 7,581 students. Shyampur I CD Block had 203 institutions with 26,563 students for special and non-formal education. It had 1 mass literacy centre.

== Healthcare ==
Shyampur I CD Block had 3 health centres, 3 clinics and 1 dispensary with 31 beds and 5 doctors in 2003. It had 28 family welfare centres.
