= Amta I =

- Community development block
- Location in West Bengal
- Coordinates: 22°37′00″N 88°01′47″E
- Country: India
- State: West Bengal
- District: Howrah
- Parliamentary constituency: Uluberia
- Assembly constituency: Uluberia Uttar, Amta

Area
  - Total: 47.74 sq mi (123.65 km^{2})
- Elevation: 20 ft (6 m)

Population (2011)
  - Total: 223,218
  - Density: 4,675.6/sq mi (1,805.2/km^{2})
- Time zone: UTC+5.30 (IST)
- PIN: 711401 (Amta)
- Area code: 03214
- Vehicle registration: WB-11, WB-12, WB-13, WB-14
- Literacy Rate: 81.26 per cent
- Website: http://howrah.gov.in/

Amta I is a community development block that forms an administrative division in Uluberia subdivision of the Howrah district in the Indian state of West Bengal.

== Geography ==
Map of Howrah District

=== Location ===
Balichak, a constituent panchayat of Amta I block, is located at 22°37′00″N 88°01′47″E

Amta I CD Block is bounded by Udaynarayanpur CD Block and Jangipara CD Block, in Hooghly district, in the north, Jagatballavpur CD Block in the east, Uluberia II and Bagnan I CD Blocks in the south and Amta II CD Block, in the west.

It is located 35 km from Howrah, the district headquarters.

=== Area and administration ===
Amta I City and community development block has an area of 123.65 km^{2}. Amta police station serves this CD Block. Amta I panchayat samity has 13 gram panchayats. The block has 77 inhabited villages. Headquarters of this block is at Amta

=== Topography ===
Howrah district is located on the west bank of the Hooghly. The Rupnarayan flows on the west and south of the district and the Damodar intersects it. The district consists of a flat alluvial plain.

=== Gram panchayats ===
Gram panchayats of Amta I block/panchayat samiti are: Amta, Bhandargachha, Khosalpur, Udang-II, Anulia, Chandrapur, Raspur, Balichak, Kanpur, Sirajbati, Basantapur, Khardah and Udang-I

== Demographics ==
=== Overview ===
Rural population is 49.63% of the total population of Howrah district as per 2001 census. Scheduled castes account for 15.41% of the population, scheduled tribes 0.44% and Muslims 24.4% of the population. As the economy is prevalently industrial, majority of the population depends on industries for a living. Only 30% of the population is engaged in cultivation.

BPL families in CD Blocks
of Howrah district
Howrah Sadar subdivision
Bally Jagachha – 4.35%
Domjur – 7.21%
Panchla – 1.82%
Sankrail – 5.67%
Jagatballavpur – 10.35%
Uluberia subdivision
Uluberia I – 23.38%
Uluberia II – 19.76%
Amta I – 16.07%
Amta II – 16.38%
Udaynarayanpur – 14.12%
Bagnan I – 18.87%
Bagnan II – 21.18%
Shyampur I – 36.51%
Shyampur II – 17.85%
Source: Rural Household
Survey 2005

=== Population ===
As per 2011 Census of India Amta I CD Block had a total population of 223,218, of which 161,193 were rural and 62,025 were urban. There were 114,487 (51%) males and 108,731 (49%) females. Population below 6 years was 24,407. Scheduled Castes numbered 66,046 and Scheduled Tribes numbered 337.

As per 2001 census, Amta I block had a total population of 200,147, out of which 102,088 were males and 98,059 were females. Amta II block registered a population growth of 9.39% during the 1991–2001 decade. Decadal growth for Howrah district was 12.76%. Decadal growth in West Bengal was 17.84%. Scheduled castes at 61,689 formed around one-third the population. Scheduled tribes numbered 1,413.

=== Census towns and large villages ===
Census Towns in Amta I CD Block (2011 census figures in brackets): Kanpur (6,069), Basontopur (13,183), Deora (6,715), Amta (16,699), Ramchandropur (6,456), Bhandar Gachha (6,156) and Odom/Udang (6,747), Madaria (4,024), Guzarpur (4,680) and Kumar Chak (4,884).

Large villages in Amta I CD Block (2011 census figures in brackets): Anulia (3,196), Balichak (3,304), Baneshwarpur (1,748), Banuchak (1,119), Baro Mayrah (1,887), Barue (3,850), Begua (1,263), Bhetkepara (2,422), Bhojan (2,474), Chakpota (2,299), Chaksador (714), Chaltakhali (3,366), Chalunia (1,449), Chatra (3,040), Chhoto Mayrah (2,132), Dadpur (521), Dokkhin Horishpur (3,794), Dokkhin Ramchandropur (1,834), Damodar Nodirchar (579), Darapur (1,024), Debandi (3,524), Dhurkhali (3,195), Fatepur (2,840), Ghoradaho (3,515), Ghoshpur (3,598), Ghuteghari (302), Gobindo Chak (1,582), Gurzarpur (4,680), Habla (1,175), Hafez Chak (489), Janjali Chak (1,002), Jyotkalyan (3,237), Jotsador (33), Kendua (1,675), Kalikata (1,651), Kashtosangra (2,282), Kansra (2,979), Kazir Chak (27), Khaira (1,260), Khardaho (5,535), Khasnan (3,221), Khoshalpur (3,922), Kotalpara (1,602), Kumar Chak (4,884), Kumaria (2,845), Kurit (3,595), Madaria (4,024), Moddhokul (1,888), Mohishguho (2,520), Mallogam (1,821), Monikara (2,797), Mato (1,920), Mollar (239), Panpur (1,651), Pearapur (1,178), Purash (2,150), Purbo Bajeprotapur (1,615), Purbo Gazipur (6,720), Putkhali (588), Ramchandropur Deetiokhando (435), Ranapara (2,420), Raspur (3,073), Ratonpota (838), Saibana (648), Someshwar (1,847), Sarpai (888), Sarpota (1,042), Serajbati (2,787), Sherpur (3,666), Sonamui (4,155), Tentuliapara (1,633), Uttor Ramchandropur (1,985)

=== Literacy ===
As per 2011 census the total number of literates in Amta I CD Block was 161,547 (81.26% of the population 6+ years) out of which 87,960 (54%) were males and 73,587 (46%) were females.

As per 2011 census, literacy in Howrah district was 78.66%. Literacy in West Bengal was 77.08% in 2011. Literacy in India in 2011 was 74.04%.

As per 2001 census, Amta I block had a total literacy of 74.37% for the six+ age group. While male literacy was 82.82% female literacy was 65.57%. Howrah district had a total literacy of 77.01%, male literacy being 83.22% and female literacy being 70.11%.

Literacy in CD blocks of
Howrah district
Howrah Sadar subdivision
Bally Jagachha – 87.75%
Domjur – 81.33%
Panchla – 78.98%
Sankrail – 83.11%
Jagatballavpur – 79.22%
Uluberia subdivision
Uluberia I – 77.39%
Uluberia II – 78.05%
Amta I – 81.26%
Amta II – 81.47%
Udaynarayanpur – 81.05%
Bagnan I – 84.09%
Bagnan II – 82.57%
Shyampur I – 78.96%
Shyampur II – 80.49%
Source: 2011 Census: CD Block Wise
Primary Census Abstract Data

=== Religion ===
Religion in Amta I CD block (2011)
Hinduism	73.04%
Islam	26.83%
Other or not stated	0.13%

In 2011 census Hindus numbered 163,046 and formed 73.04% of the population in Amta I CD Block. Muslims numbered 59,990 and formed 26.83% of the population. Others numbered 272 and formed 0.13% of the population.

In 2011, Hindus numbered 3,535,844 and formed 72.90% of the population in Howrah district. Muslims numbered 1,270,641 and formed 26.20% of the population. In West Bengal Hindus numbered 64,385,546 and formed 70.53% of the population. Muslims numbered 24,654,825 and formed 27.01% of the population.

Bengali is the predominant language, spoken by 99.59% of the population.

== Economy ==
=== Infrastructure ===
Prior to 2003–04, Amta I CD Block had 285 hectares of vested land, out of which 93 hectares were distributed amongst 1,594 persons. In Amta I CD Block more than one crop was grown in 5,421 hectares. Net area sown in the block was 8,605 hectares. Amta I had 9999 hectares of canals for irrigation. In Amta I CD Block 80 mouzas were electrified up to March 2004.

== Education ==
In 2003–04, Amta I CD Block had 133 primary schools with 19,646 students, three middle schools with 1,173 students, 20 high schools with 10,502 students and seven higher secondary schools with 6,300 students. Amta I CD Block had two colleges with 2,239 students. Amta I CD Block had 203 institutions with 25,777 students for special and non-formal education. It had two mass literacy centres.

== Healthcare ==
Amta I CD Block had four health centres, two clinic and two dispensaries with 47 beds and eight doctors in 2003. It had 32 family welfare centres.
