= Bagnan II =

- Community development block
- Location in West Bengal
- Coordinates: 22°25′37″N 87°59′27″E
- Country: India
- State: West Bengal
- District: Howrah
- Parliamentary constituency: Uluberia
- Assembly constituency: Bagnan

Area
  - Total: 29.93 sq mi (77.52 km^{2})
- Elevation: 30 ft (9 m)

Population (2011)
  - Total: 164,405
  - Density: 5,493/sq mi (2,121/km^{2})
- Time zone: UTC+5.30 (IST)
- PIN: 711312 (Mugkalyan); 711104 (Sarat Chatterjee Rd.)
- Area code: 03228
- Vehicle registration: WB-11, WB-12, WB-13, WB-14
- Literacy Rate: 82.57 per cent
- Website: http://howrah.gov.in/

Bagnan II is a community development block that forms an administrative division in Uluberia subdivision of Howrah district in the Indian state of West Bengal.

== Geography ==
=== Location ===
Chandrabhag, a constituent panchayat of Bagnan II block, is located at 22°25′37″N 87°59′27″E.

Bagnan II CD Block is bounded by Bagnan I CD Block in the north, Uluberia I CD Block in the east, Shyampur II CD Block in the south and Sahid Matangini and Kolaghat CD Blocks, in Purba Medinipur district, across the Rupnarayan, in the west.

It is located 44 km from Howrah, the district headquarters.

=== Area and administration ===
Bagnan II CD Block has an area of 77.52 km^{2}. Bagnan police station serves this CD Block. Bagnan II panchayat samity has 7 gram panchayats. The block has 47 inhabited villages. Headquarters of this block is at Bagnan.

=== Topography ===
Howrah district is located on the west bank of the Hooghly. The Rupnarayan flows on the west and south of the district and the Damodar intersects it. The district consists of a flat alluvial plain.

=== Gram panchayats ===
Gram panchayats of Bagnan II block/panchayat samiti are: Antila, Bantul- Baidyanathpur, Chandrabhag, Halyan, Mugkalyan Benapur, Orphooli and Saratchandra.

==== Mugkalyan Benapur ====
It has a scenic village and a river view point called Benapur.

== Demographics ==
=== Overview ===
Rural population is 49.63% of the total population of Howrah district as per 2001 census. Scheduled castes account for 15.41% of the population, scheduled tribes 0.44% and Muslims 24.4% of the population. As the economy is prevalently industrial, majority of the population depends on industries for a living. Only 30% of the population is engaged in cultivation.

BPL families in CD Blocks
of Howrah district
Howrah Sadar subdivision
Bally Jagachha – 4.35%
Domjur – 7.21%
Panchla – 1.82%
Sankrail – 5.67%
Jagatballavpur – 10.35%
Uluberia subdivision
Uluberia I – 23.38%
Uluberia II – 19.76%
Amta I – 16.07%
Amta II – 16.38%
Udaynarayanpur – 14.12%
Bagnan I – 18.87%
Bagnan II – 21.18%
Shyampur I – 36.51%
Shyampur II – 17.85%
Source: Rural Household
Survey 2005

=== Population ===
As per 2011 Census of India Bagnan II CD Block had a total population of 164,405, of which 119,033 were rural and 45,372 were urban. There were 84,539 (51%) males and 79,866 (49%) females. Population below 6 years was 19,026. Scheduled Castes numbered 17,341 and Scheduled Tribes numbered 793.

As per 2001 census, Bagnan II block had a total population of 146,110, out of which 75,330 were males and 70,780 were females. Bagnan II block registered a population growth of 14.81 per cent during the 1991-2001 decade. Decadal growth for Howrah district was 12.76 per cent. Decadal growth in West Bengal was 17.84 per cent. Scheduled castes at 16,818 formed around one-eighth the population. Scheduled tribes numbered 1,910.

=== Census Towns and large villages ===
Census Towns in Bagnan II CD Block (2011 census figures in brackets): Naupala (7,856), Barunda (7,534), Kulitapara (5,895), Kanaipur (4,782), Batul (4,707), Mugkalyan (7,961) and Halyan (6,637).

Large villages in Bagnan II CD Block (2011 census figures in brackets): Mellak (5,713), Chak Kamala (5,654), Birkul (4,023), Baidyanathpur (5,989), Benapur (6,655), Chandanapara (4,342), Khajurnan (4,903), Rabibhag (8,976), Rupasgari (7,240) and Chhayani Guzrat (4,071).

=== Literacy ===
As per 2011 census the total number of literates in Bagnan II CD Block was 120,042 (82.57% of the population over 6 years) out of which 65,023 (54%) were males and 55,019 (46%) were females.

As per 2011 census, literacy in Howrah district was 78.66%. Literacy in West Bengal was 77.08% in 2011. Literacy in India in 2011 was 74.04%.

As per 2001 census, Bagnan II block had a total literacy of 75.20 per cent for the 6+ age group. While male literacy was 82.86 per cent female literacy was 67.02 per cent. Howrah district had a total literacy of 77.01 per cent, male literacy being 83.22 per cent and female literacy being 70.11 per cent.

Literacy in CD blocks of
Howrah district
Howrah Sadar subdivision
Bally Jagachha – 87.75%
Domjur – 81.33%
Panchla – 78.98%
Sankrail – 83.11%
Jagatballavpur – 79.22%
Uluberia subdivision
Uluberia I – 77.39%
Uluberia II – 78.05%
Amta I – 81.26%
Amta II – 81.47%
Udaynarayanpur – 81.05%
Bagnan I – 84.09%
Bagnan II – 82.57%
Shyampur I – 78.96%
Shyampur II – 80.49%
Source: 2011 Census: CD Block Wise
Primary Census Abstract Data

=== Language ===
Bengali is the local language in these areas.

=== Religion ===
Religion in Bagnan II CD block (2011)
| Hinduism | 72.51% |
| Islam | 27.37% |
| Other or not stated | 0.12% |

In 2011 census Hindus numbered 119,207 and formed 72.51% of the population in Bagnan II CD Block. Muslims numbered 45,001 and formed 27.37% of the population. Others numbered 197 and formed 0.12% of the population.

In 2011, Hindus numbered 3,535,844 and formed 72.90% of the population in Howrah district. Muslims numbered 1,270,641 and formed 26.20% of the population. In West Bengal Hindus numbered 64,385,546 and formed 70.53% of the population. Muslims numbered 24,654,825 and formed 27.01% of the population.

Bengali is the predominant language, spoken by 99.33% of the population.

== Economy ==
=== Infrastructure ===
Up to 2003–04, Bagnan II CD Block had 235 hectares of vested land, out of which 125 hectares were distributed amongst 1,878 persons. Bagnan II had 2,350 hectares of canals for irrigation. In Bagnan II CD Block 48 mouzas were electrified up to March 2004.

== Education ==
In 2003–04, Bagnan II CD Block had 97 primary schools with 13,983 students, 3 middle schools with 1,123 students, 12 high schools with 8,507 students and 5 higher secondary schools with 6,033 students. Bagnan II CD Block had 1 professional and technical education with 1,315 students. Bagnan II CD Block had 156 institutions with 20,980 students for special and non-formal education. It had 2 mass literacy centres.

== Healthcare ==
Bagnan II CD Block had 3 health centres and 1 clinic with 22 beds and 5 doctors in 2003. It had 20 family welfare centres.
