= Khalor =

- Census Town
- Location in West Bengal, India Khalor (India)
- Coordinates: 22.45805°N 87.9742°E
- Country: India
- State: West Bengal
- District: Howrah

Population (2011)
  - Total: 9,636

Languages
  - Official: Bengali, English
- Time zone: UTC+5:30 (IST)
- ISO 3166 code: IN-WB
- Vehicle registration: WB
- Website: wb.gov.in

Khalor is a census town in Bagnan I CD Block of Uluberia subdivision in Howrah district in the Indian state of West Bengal.

== Demographics ==
As per 2011 Census of India Khalor had a total population of 9,636 of which 4,864 (50%) were males and 4,772 (50%) were females. Population below 6 years was 749. The total number of literates in Khalor was 8,231 (92.62% of the population over 6 years).

As of 2001 India census, Khalor had a population of 8669. Males constitute 51% of the population and females 49%. Khalor has an average literacy rate of 83%, higher than the national average of 59.5%: male literacy is 87%, and female literacy is 79%. In Khalor, 8% of the population is under 6 years of age.
