= Uluberia subdivision =

Uluberia Sub-Division উলুবেড়িয়া মহকুমা
- subdivision
- Map of Uluberia Subdivision

- Location in West Bengal, India Uluberia Sub-Division (India)
- Coordinates: 22.47°N 88.11°E
- Country: India
- State: West Bengal
- District: Howrah
- Headquarters: Uluberia

Population (2011)
  - Total: 2,038,685

Languages
  - Official: Bengali, English
- Time zone: UTC+5:30 (IST)
- ISO 3166 code: ISO 3166-2:IN
- Vehicle registration: WB
- Website: wb.gov.in

Uluberia subdivision is a subdivision of the Howrah district in the state of West Bengal, India. It consists of Uluberia municipality and nine community development (CD) blocks, including 90 gram panchayats and six census towns. The six census towns are: Khalor, Bagnan, Naupala, Santoshpur, Balaram Pota and Uttar Pirpur. The subdivision has its headquarters at Uluberia. The whole division forms the Lok Sabha constituency of Uluberia.

== Area ==
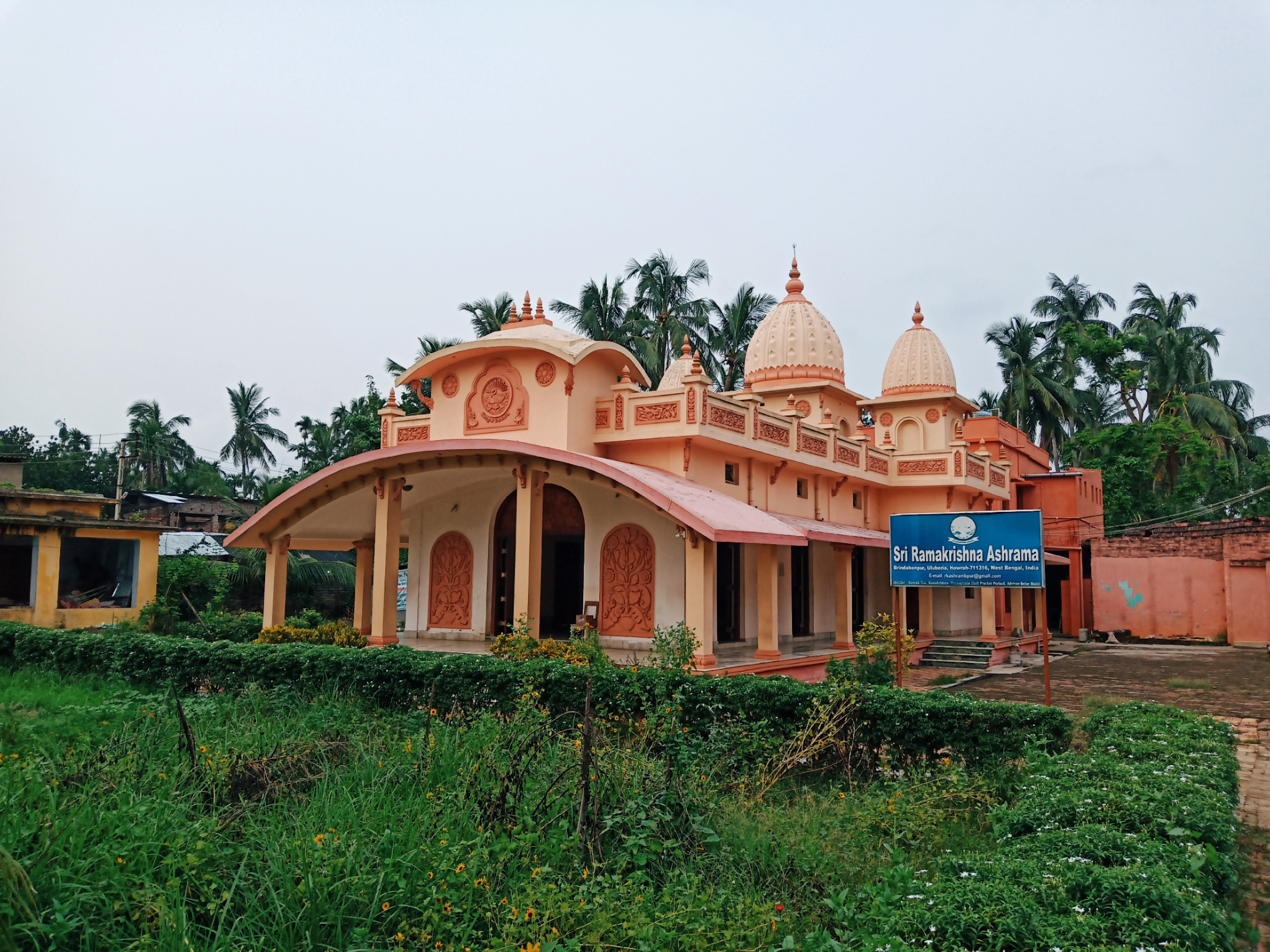
Sri Ramkrishna Ashram, Brindabanpur, Uluberia

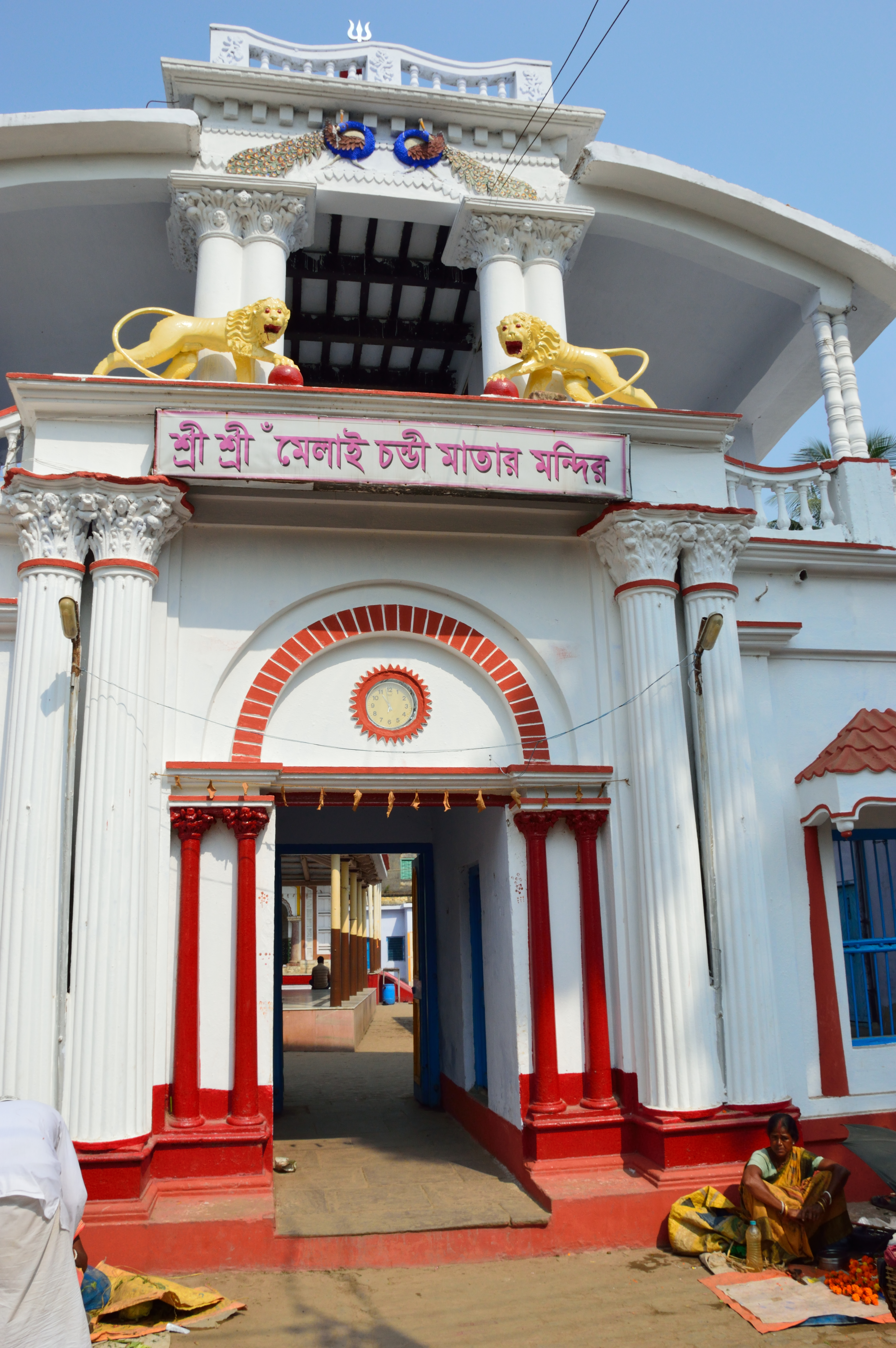
Gateway of Melai Chandi Mandir, Amta

Division	Headquarters	Census town(s)	Gram panchayats	Police area	West Bengal legislative area
Uluberia municipality	Uluberia	0	0	-	Uluberia Purba
Uluberia I	Uluberia	0	9: Bahira, Hatgachha-I, Kalinagar, Chandipur, Hatgachha-II, Maheshpur, Birshibpur, Dhulasimla, Heerapur, Tapna.	Uluberia	Uluberia Dakshin
Uluberia II	Rajapur	3: Santoshpur, Balaram Pota, Uttar Pirpur	8: Baniban, Khalisani, Tehatta-Kantaberia-I, Tehatta-Kantaberia-II, Basudevpur, Raghudevpur, Joargori and Tulsiberia.	Rajapur, Uluberia	Uluberia Purba, Uluberia Uttar (SC)
Amta I	Amta	0	13: Amta, Bhandargachha, Khosalpur, Udang–II, Anulia, Chandrapur, Raspur, Balichak, Kanpur, Sirajbati, Basantapur, Khardah and Udang–I	Amta	Udaynarayanpur, Uluberia Uttar (SC)
Amta II	Jaypur Fakirdas	0	14: Amragori, Ghoraberia Chitnan, Khalna, Tajpur, Bhatora, Jhamtia, Kasmoli, Thalia, Binola Krishnabati, Jaypur, Kusberia, Gazipur, Jhikhira and Noyapara	Jaypur and Amta	Amta
Udaynarayanpur	Udaynaryanpur	0	11: Bhabanipur Bidhichandrapur, Harali Udaynarayanpur, Khila, Rampur–Dihibhursut Asanda, Kurchi Shibpur, Debipur, Harishpu,Raghunathpur, Garbhabanipur–Sonatala, Kanupat Mansuka, Pancharul and Singti	Udaynarayanpur	Udaynarayanpur
Bagnan I	Bagnan	2: Khalor, Bagnan	10: Bagnan-I, Baksihat, Haturia-II, Sabsit, Bagnan-II, Bangalpur, Kalyanpur, Bainan, Haturia–I and Khalore	Bagnan	Bagnan, Amta
Bagnan II	Khalor	1: Naupala	7: Antila, Chandrabhag, Mugkalyan Benapur, Bantul–Baidyanathpur, Saratchandra, Halyan and Orphooli	Bagnan	Bagnan
Shyampur I	Shyampur	0	10: Balichaturi, Belari, Kamalpur, Shyampur, Baneswarpur–I, Dhandali, Nabagram, Baneswarpur–II, Dingakhola and Radhapur	Shyampur	Uluberia Dakshin, Shyampur
Shyampur II	Sasati	0	8: Amardaha, Bargram, Dihimondalghat–II, Nakol, Bachhri, Dihimondalghat-I, Kharuberia and Shashati	Shyampur	Shyampur

== Legislative segments ==
The whole of Uluberia subdivision elects to the Uluberia constituency of the Lok Sabha. There are 7 constituencies for the West Bengal Legislative Assembly (Vidhan Sabha). The Uluberia Uttar constituency will be reserved for Scheduled castes (SC) candidates.

- Uluberia Purba (assembly constituency no. 176) - Uluberia municipality area and the gram panchayats of Khalisani and Raghudevpur under the Uluberia-II block
- Uluberia Uttar (SC) (assembly constituency no. 179) - the other six gram panchayats under the Uluberia-II block and eight gram panchayats under the Amta-I block: Amta, Bhandargachha, Chandrapur, Khardah, Raspur, Sirajbati, Udang-I and Udang-II
- Uluberia Dakshin (assembly constituency no. 180) - The Uluberia-I block and the gram panchayats of Belari, Dhandali, Balichaturi and Nabagram under the Shyampur-I block
- Shyampur (assembly constituency no. 181) - formed from the Shyampur-II CD block, and the other six gram panchayats under the Shyampur-I block
- Bagnan (assembly constituency no. 182) - formed from the whole Bagnan-II block, and the following gram panchayats of Bagnan-I: Bangalpur, Haturia-I, Haturia-II and Khalore
- Amta (assembly constituency no. 183) - formed from Amta-II and the other four gram panchayats under the Bagnan-I CD block
- Udaynarayanpur (assembly constituency no. 184) - formed from the Udaynarayanpur CD block, and from the other five gram panchayats from Amta I
