= Nalpur =

- Census Town
- Location in West Bengal, India Nalpur (India)
- Coordinates: 22.53°N 88.19°E
- Country: India
- State: West Bengal
- District: Howrah
- Elevation: 6 m (20 ft)

Population (2011)
  - Total: 6,911

Languages
  - Official: Bengali, English
- Time zone: UTC+5:30 (IST)
- Vehicle registration: WB
- Lok Sabha constituency: Howrah
- Vidhan Sabha constituency: Sankrail
- Website: howrah.gov.in

Nalpur is a census town in Sankrail CD Block of Howrah Sadar subdivision in Howrah district in the Indian state of West Bengal.

== Geography ==
Nalpur is located at 22.53°N 88.19°E. It has an average elevation of 6 m (20 ft).

== Demographics ==
As per 2011 Census of India Nalpur had a total population of 6,911 of which 3,470 (50%) were males and 3,441 (50%) were females. Population below 6 years was 919. The total number of literates in Nalpur was 4,813 (80.32% of the population over 6 years).

Nalpur was part of Kolkata Urban Agglomeration in the 2011 census.

As of 2001 India census, Nalpur had a population of 5644. Males constitute 50% of the population and females 50%. Nalpur has an average literacy rate of 61%, higher than the national average of 59.5%; with 55% of the males and 45% of females literate. 16% of the population is under 6 years of age.

== Transport ==
Nalpur railway station on Howrah-Kharagpur line serves the locality.
