= Uttar Pirpur =

- Census Town
- Location in West Bengal, India Uttar Pirpur (India)
- Coordinates: 22.49°N 88.10°E
- Country: India
- State: West Bengal
- District: Howrah

Population (2011)
  - Total: 5,868

Languages
  - Official: Bengali, English
- Time zone: UTC+5:30 (IST)
- Vehicle registration: WB
- Lok Sabha constituency: Uluberia
- Vidhan Sabha constituency: Uluberia Uttar
- Website: wb.gov.in

Uttar Pirpur is a census town in Uluberia II CD Block of Uluberia subdivision in Howrah district in the Indian state of West Bengal.

== Geography ==
Uttar Pirpur is located at 22.49°N 88.10°E.

== Demographics ==
As per 2011 Census of India Uttar Pirpur had a total population of 5,868 of which 3,049 (52%) were males and 2,819 (48%) were females. Population below 6 years was 839. The total number of literates in Uttar Pirpur was 3,987 (79.28% of the population over 6 years).

Uttar Pirpur was part of Kolkata Urban Agglomeration in 2011 census.

As of 2001 India census, Uttar Pirpur had a population of 4789. Males constitute 52% of the population and females 48%. Uttar Pirpur has an average literacy rate of 63%, higher than the national average of 59.5%: male literacy is 69%, and female literacy is 58%. In Uttar Pirpur, 13% of the population is under 6 years of age.
