= Balaram Pota =

- Census Town
- Location in West Bengal, India Balaram Pota (India)
- Coordinates: 22.51147°N 88.14724°E
- Country: India
- State: West Bengal
- District: Howrah

Population (2011)
  - Total: 5,544

Languages
  - Official: Bengali, English
- Time zone: UTC+5:30 (IST)
- Vehicle registration: WB
- Lok Sabha constituency: Uluberia
- Vidhan Sabha constituency: Uluberia Uttar
- Website: howrah.gov.in

Balaram Pota is a census town in Uluberia II CD Block of Uluberia subdivision in Howrah district in the Indian state of West Bengal.

== Geography ==
Balaram Pota is located at 22°30′41″N 88°08′50″E

== Demographics ==
As per 2011 Census of India Balaram Pota had a total population of 5,544 of which 2,853 (51%) were males and 2,691 (49%) were females. Population below 6 years was 718. The total number of literates in Balaram Pota was 4,354 (90.22% of the population over 6 years).

Balaram Pota was part of Kolkata Urban Agglomeration in 2011 census.

As of 2001 India census, Balaram Pota had a population of 4,488. Males constitute 52% of the population and females 48%. Balaram Pota has an average literacy rate of 71%, higher than the national average of 59.5%; with 56% of the males and 44% of females literate. 14% of the population is under 6 years of age.
