= Bagnan I =

- Community development block
- Location in West Bengal
- Coordinates: 22°30′11″N 87°54′43″E
- Country: India
- State: West Bengal
- District: Howrah
- Parliamentary constituency: Uluberia
- Assembly constituency: Bagnan, Amta

Area
  - Total: 32.05 sq mi (83.01 km^{2})
- Elevation: 30 ft (9 m)

Population (2011)
  - Total: 221,500
  - Density: 6,911/sq mi (2,668/km^{2})
- Time zone: UTC+5.30 (IST)
- PIN: 711303 (Bagnan)
- Area code: 03229
- Vehicle registration: WB-11, WB-12, WB-13, WB-14
- Literacy Rate: 84.09 per cent
- Website: http://howrah.gov.in/

Bagnan I is a community development block (CD Block) that forms an administrative division in Uluberia subdivision of Howrah district in the Indian state of West Bengal.

== Geography ==
Map of Howrah District

=== Location ===
Kalyanpur, a constituent panchayat of Bagnan I block, is located at 22°30′11″N 87°54′43″E.

Bagnan I CD Block is bounded by Amta II and Amta I CD Blocks in the north, Uluberia II and Uluberia I CD Blocks in the east, Bagnan II CD Block in the south and Kolaghat CD Block, in Purba Medinipur district, across the Rupnarayan, in the west.

It is located 44 km from Howrah, the district headquarters.

=== Area and administration ===
Bagnan I CD Block has an area of 83.01 km^{2}. Bagnan police station serves this CD Block. Bagnan I panchayat samity has 10 gram panchayats. The block has 49 inhabited villages. Headquarters of this block is at Bagnan.

=== Topography ===
Howrah district is located on the west bank of the Hooghly. The Rupnarayan flows on the west and south of the district and the Damodar intersects it. The district consists of a flat alluvial plain.

=== Gram panchayats ===
Gram panchayats of Bagnan I block/panchayat samiti are: Bagnan I, Bagnan II, Bainan, Baksihat, Bangalpur, Haturia I, Haturia II, Kalyanpur, Khalore and Sabsit.

== Demographics ==
=== Overview ===
Rural population is 49.63% of the total population of Howrah district as per 2001 census. Scheduled castes account for 15.41% of the population, scheduled tribes 0.44% and Muslims 24.4% of the population. As the economy is prevalently industrial, majority of the population depends on industries for a living. Only 30% of the population is engaged in cultivation.

BPL families in CD Blocks
of Howrah district
Howrah Sadar subdivision
Bally Jagachha – 4.35%
Domjur – 7.21%
Panchla – 1.82%
Sankrail – 5.67%
Jagatballavpur – 10.35%
Uluberia subdivision
Uluberia I – 23.38%
Uluberia II – 19.76%
Amta I – 16.07%
Amta II – 16.38%
Udaynarayanpur – 14.12%
Bagnan I – 18.87%
Bagnan II – 21.18%
Shyampur I – 36.51%
Shyampur II – 17.85%
Source: Rural Household
Survey 2005

=== Population ===
As per 2011 Census of India Bagnan I CD Block had a total population of 221,500, of which 140,116 were rural and 81,384 were uban. There were 113,869 (51%) males and 107,631 (49%) females. Population below 6 years was 25,860. Scheduled Castes numbered 31,475 and Scheduled Tribes numbered 261.

As per 2001 census, Bagnan I block had a total population of 191,188, out of which 97,967 were males and 93,221 were females. Bagnan I block registered a population growth of 16.21 per cent during the 1991-2001 decade. Decadal growth for Howrah district was 12.76 per cent. Decadal growth in West Bengal was 17.84 per cent. Scheduled castes at 30,454 formed around one-sixth the population. Scheduled tribes numbered 1,825.

=== Census Towns and large villages ===
Census Towns in Bagnan I CD Block (2011 census figures in brackets): Deulgram (6,517), Karia (4,737), Paschim Bainan (12,405), Kalyanpur (8,914), Khajutti (7,380), Bangalpur (6,760), Chandrapur (4,742), Khaidnan (9,297), Bagnan (10,996) and Khalor (9,636).

Large villages in Bagnan I CD Block (2011 census figures in brackets): Mankur (7,144), Purbba Bainan (4,746), Dwipamalita (4,025), Birampur (5,755), Panitras (5,227), Sabsit (6,736), Joka (4,137), Harop (5,477), Hature Kandarpapur (7,079), Murgaberia (5,936) and Ulanpara (8,369).

=== Literacy ===
As per 2011 census the total number of literates in Bagnan I CD Block was 164,522 (84.09% of the population over 6 years) out of which 88,531 (54%) were males and 75,991 (46%) were females.

As per 2011 census, literacy in Howrah district was 78.66%. Literacy in West Bengal was 77.08% in 2011. Literacy in India in 2011 was 74.04%.

As per 2001 census, Bagnan I block had a total literacy of 76.22 per cent for the 6+ age group. While male literacy was 83.28 per cent female literacy was 68.81 per cent. Howrah district had a total literacy of 77.01 per cent, male literacy being 83.22 per cent and female literacy being 70.11 per cent.

Literacy in CD blocks of
Howrah district
Howrah Sadar subdivision
Bally Jagachha – 87.75%
Domjur – 81.33%
Panchla – 78.98%
Sankrail – 83.11%
Jagatballavpur – 79.22%
Uluberia subdivision
Uluberia I – 77.39%
Uluberia II – 78.05%
Amta I – 81.26%
Amta II – 81.47%
Udaynarayanpur – 81.05%
Bagnan I – 84.09%
Bagnan II – 82.57%
Shyampur I – 78.96%
Shyampur II – 80.49%
Source: 2011 Census: CD Block Wise
Primary Census Abstract Data

=== Religion and language ===
Religion in Bagnan I CD block (2011)
| Hinduism | 62.95% |
| Islam | 36.74% |
| Other or not stated | 0.31% |

In 2011 census Hindus numbered 139,429 and formed 62.95% of the population in Bagnan I CD Block. Muslims numbered 81,373 and formed 36.74% of the population. Others numbered 896 and formed 0.31% of the population.

In 2011, Hindus numbered 3,535,844 and formed 72.90% of the population in Howrah district. Muslims numbered 1,270,641 and formed 26.20% of the population. In West Bengal Hindus numbered 64,385,546 and formed 70.53% of the population. Muslims numbered 24,654,825 and formed 27.01% of the population.

Bengali is the predominant language, spoken by 99.67% of the population.

== Economy ==
=== Infrastructure ===
Up to 2003–04, Bagnan I CD Block had 203 hectares of vested land, out of which 175 hectares were distributed amongst 1,623 persons. Bagnan I had 3,000 hectares of canals for irrigation. In Bagnan I CD Block 49 mouzas were electrified up to March 2004.

== Education ==
In 2003–04, Bagnan I CD Block had 107 primary schools with 18,141 students, 4 middle schools with 1,307 students, 8 high schools with 7,278 students and 9 higher secondary schools with 8,683 students. Bagnan I CD Block had 1 general college with 2,975 students. Bagnan I CD Block had 210 institutions with 23,805 students for special and non-formal education. It had 1 mass literacy centre.

== Healthcare ==
Bagnan I CD Block had 3 health centres, 3 clinics and 1 hospital with 52 beds and 9 doctors in 2003. There are 27 family welfare centres in Bagnan CD.
