= Amta =

- Census Town
- Location in West Bengal, India Amta (India)
- Coordinates: 22°34′24″N 88°0′58″E
- Country: India
- State: West Bengal
- District: Howrah

Population (2011)
  - Total: 16,699

Languages
  - Official: Bengali, English
- Time zone: UTC+5:30 (IST)
- PIN: 711401
- Vehicle registration: WB
- Website: howrah.gov.in

Amta is a census town in Amta I CD Block in Uluberia subdivision of Howrah district in the Indian state of West Bengal. It's located about 40 km southwest of Kolkata.

== Demographics ==
Per the 2011 Census of India, Amta had a total population of 16,699, of which 8,454 (51%) were males and 8,245 (49%) were females. The population younger than six years old was 1,522. The total number of literate people in Amta was 12,918 (85.12% of the population was over six years old).

== Transport ==
Since 2000, Amta has been served by a broad gauge line. Earlier, it was served by the 45-km Howrah-Amta narrow-gauge route of the Martin's Light Railways, a private rail service established in 1892. The rail company was shut down in 1971. Amta railway station is part of the Kolkata Suburban Railway railway system.
