= Santoshpur, Uluberia =

SANTOSHPUR
- Census Town
- Location in West Bengal, India SANTOSHPUR (India)
- Coordinates: 22.50°N 88.17°E
- Country: India
- State: West Bengal
- District: South 24 Pargana
- Elevation: 6 m (20 ft)

Population (2011)
  - Total: 7,695

Languages
  - Official: Bengali, English
- Time zone: UTC+5:30 (IST)
- Vehicle registration: WB
- Lok Sabha constituency: Dimond Harbour
- Vidhan Sabha constituency: Maheshtala, Metiabruz
- Website: wb.gov.in

Santoshpur is a census town in Thakurpukur Maheshtala CD Block of Alipore Sadar subdivision in South 24 Pargana district in the Indian state of West Bengal.

== Geography ==
Santoshpur is located at 22.50°N 88.17°E.

== Demographics ==
As per 2011 Census of India Santoshpur had a total population of 7,695 of which 3,879 (50%) were males and 3,816 (50%) were females. Population below 6 years was 896. The total number of literates in Santoshpur was 5,757 (84.67% of the population over 6 years).

Santoshpur was part of Kolkata Urban Agglomeration in 2011 census.

As of 2001 India census, Santoshpur had a population of 7,181. Males constitute 52% of the population and females 48%. Santoshpur has an average literacy rate of 74%, higher than the national average of 59.5%: male literacy is 80%, and female literacy is 69%. In Santoshpur, 12% of the population is under 6 years of age.
