= Rupnarayan River =

River in India

Coordinates: 22°13′N 88°03′E

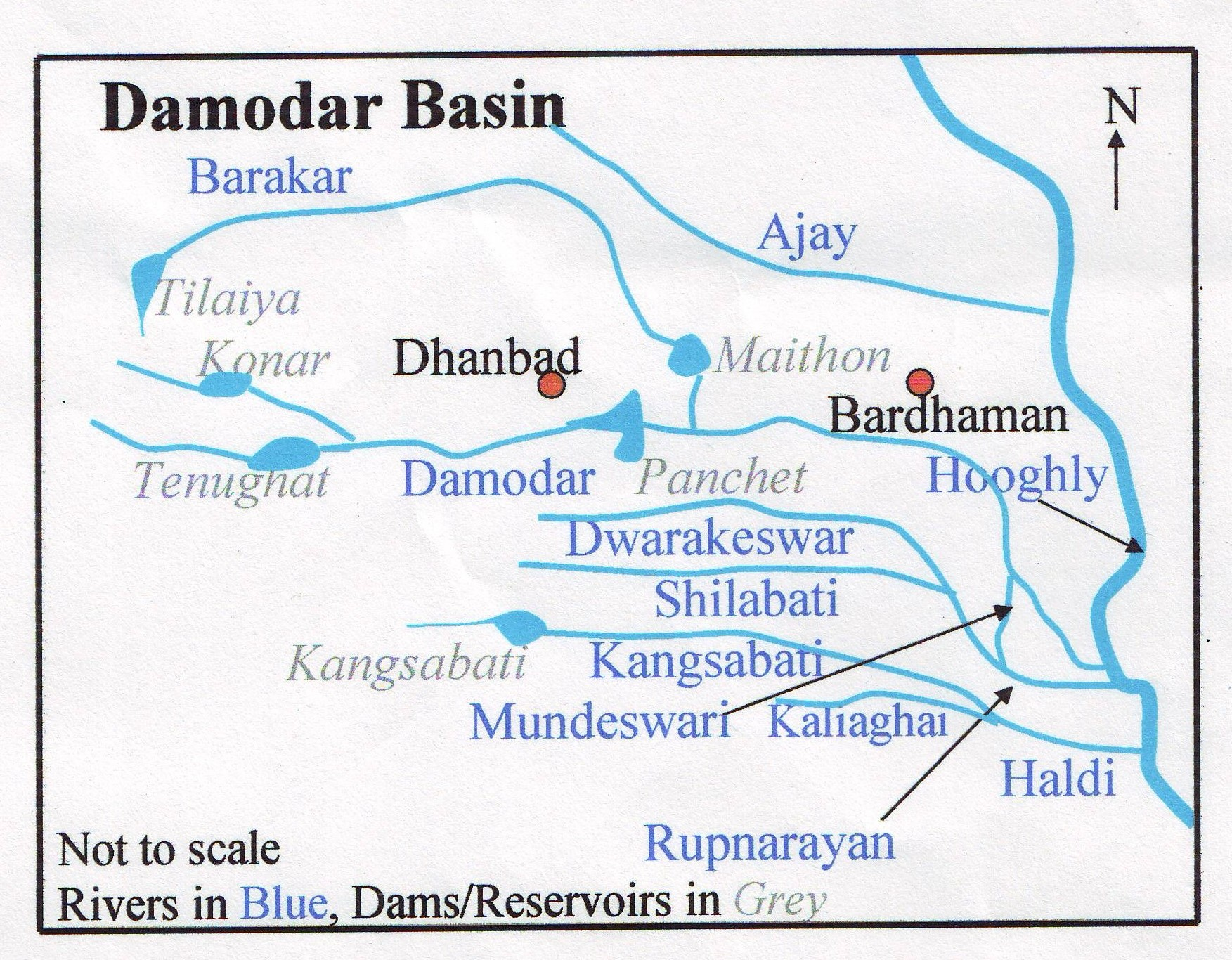
- Native name: রূপনারায়ণ নদী (Bengali)

Location
- Country: India
- State: West Bengal
- City: Kolaghat, Tamluk

Physical characteristics
- Source
  - location: Purulia, West Bengal, India
- Mouth
  - location: India
- Discharge
  - location: Hooghly River

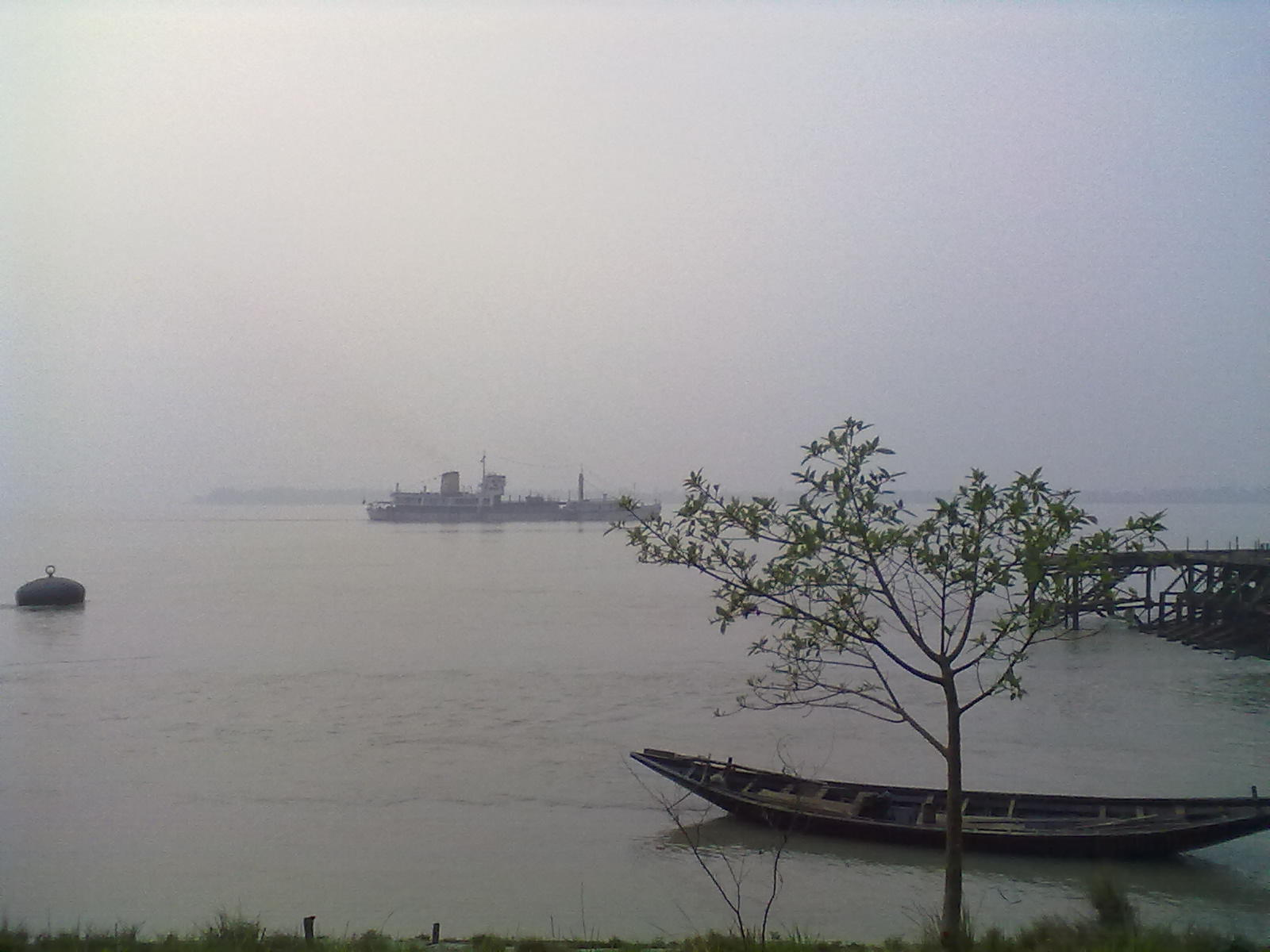
Rupnarayan river and Hooghly river connecting at Gadiara

The Rupnarayan is a river in the state of West Bengal, India. It begins as the Dhaleswari (Dhalkisor) in the Chhota Nagpur plateau foothills northeast of the town of Purulia. It then follows a tortuous southeasterly course past the town of Bankura, where it is known as the Dwarakeswar river. Near the town of Ghatal, it is joined by the Shilabati river, where it takes the name Rupnarayan. Finally, it discharges into the Hoogli River.

It is famous for the Hilsa fish that thrives in its waters and is used in Bengali cuisine. It is also notable for the West Bengal Power Development Corporation Limited (WBPDCL) thermal power plant built along its bank at Kolaghat in West Bengal. The river also passes through Bagnan in Howrah district and Tamluk in Purba Medinipur district and forms the eastern boundary of district Purba Medinipur with district Howrah.

== History ==
A distinctive fact about this river is that, Tamralipta port (ancient Gupta port) now Tamluk was on the banks of Rupnarayan river.

== See also ==
- List of rivers of India
