= Education in Howrah =

Howrah is a city in West Bengal, India; the education system of Howrah is described below.

== Schooling ==
Howrah's schools are either run by the state government or by private institutions. The medium of instruction is Bengali, English or Hindi. The school system of Howrah is divided into three terms (primary, secondary and higher secondary) and there are many affiliations of the schools.

=== K-5 Schools ===
The kindergarten and primary schools are mostly affiliated with West Bengal Board of Primary Education, Central Board of Secondary Education, Indian Certificate of Secondary Education. Some of the notable primary schools are Kidzee kindergarten school, Phanindranath Kindergarten School, Howrah Homes Primary School, St. Francis Assisi School (Bankta) etc.

=== Secondary and Higher Secondary ===
The secondary and Higher Secondary schools have many affiliations: Central Board of Secondary Education, Council for the Indian School Certificate Examinations, West Bengal Board of Madrasah Education, West Bengal Council of Higher Secondary Education, West Bengal Board of Secondary Education and National Institute of Open Schooling. Howrah's most notable schools include B.E. College Model School, Delhi Public School, Sudhir Memorial Institute Liluah, Agrasain Balika Siksha Sadan SCHOOL, Julien Day School, Howrah, Howrah Vivekananda Institution, Santragachi Kedarnath Institution, Howrah, Howrah Zilla School, Howrah High School etc.

Howrah Zilla School is the oldest running school in Howrah founded in 1845. Mahiary Kundu Chowdhury Institution, situated in Andul is the oldest school of Howrah founded in 1841. It is the only Governmental school in Howrah. Howrah's first vernacular Bengali medium school was established in 1857 by Kedarnath Bhattacharya, first Indian chairman of Howrah Municipal Corporation. In 1870 it was named Santragachi Minor School. Currently it is named Santragachi Kedarnath Institution, Howrah.

== Colleges ==
There are many colleges in Howrah. Most of the colleges are affiliated to University of Calcutta.

=== General Colleges ===
Some notable colleges are Bijoy Krishna Girls' College, Prabhu Jagatbandhu College, Dr. Kanailal Bhattacharya College, Narasinha Dutt College etc.

=== Engineering colleges ===
The engineering colleges are affiliated to West Bengal University of Technology. The Indian Institute of Engineering Science and Technology, Shibpur is a public engineering and research institution. It is the second oldest engineering institution in India, and is an Indian institute of national importance. The other engineering colleges include Engineering Institute For Junior Executives, MCKV Institute of Engineering, Seacom Engineering College etc.

=== Medical Colleges ===
Medical and Dental Colleges include Mahesh Bhattacharya Homoeopathic Medical College and Hospital, Netai Charan Chakravarty Homoeopathic Medical College & Hospital etc.

== Industrial training institutes ==
The Industrial Training Institutes are affiliated to West Bengal State Council of Vocational Education and Training. The notable IT institutes include Industrial Training Institute, Shibpur, Industrial Training Institute, Howrah Homes, and Howrah ITI Institute.

== See also ==
- Howrah
- List of High Schools in Howrah
