= Kadamtala =

- Neighbourhood
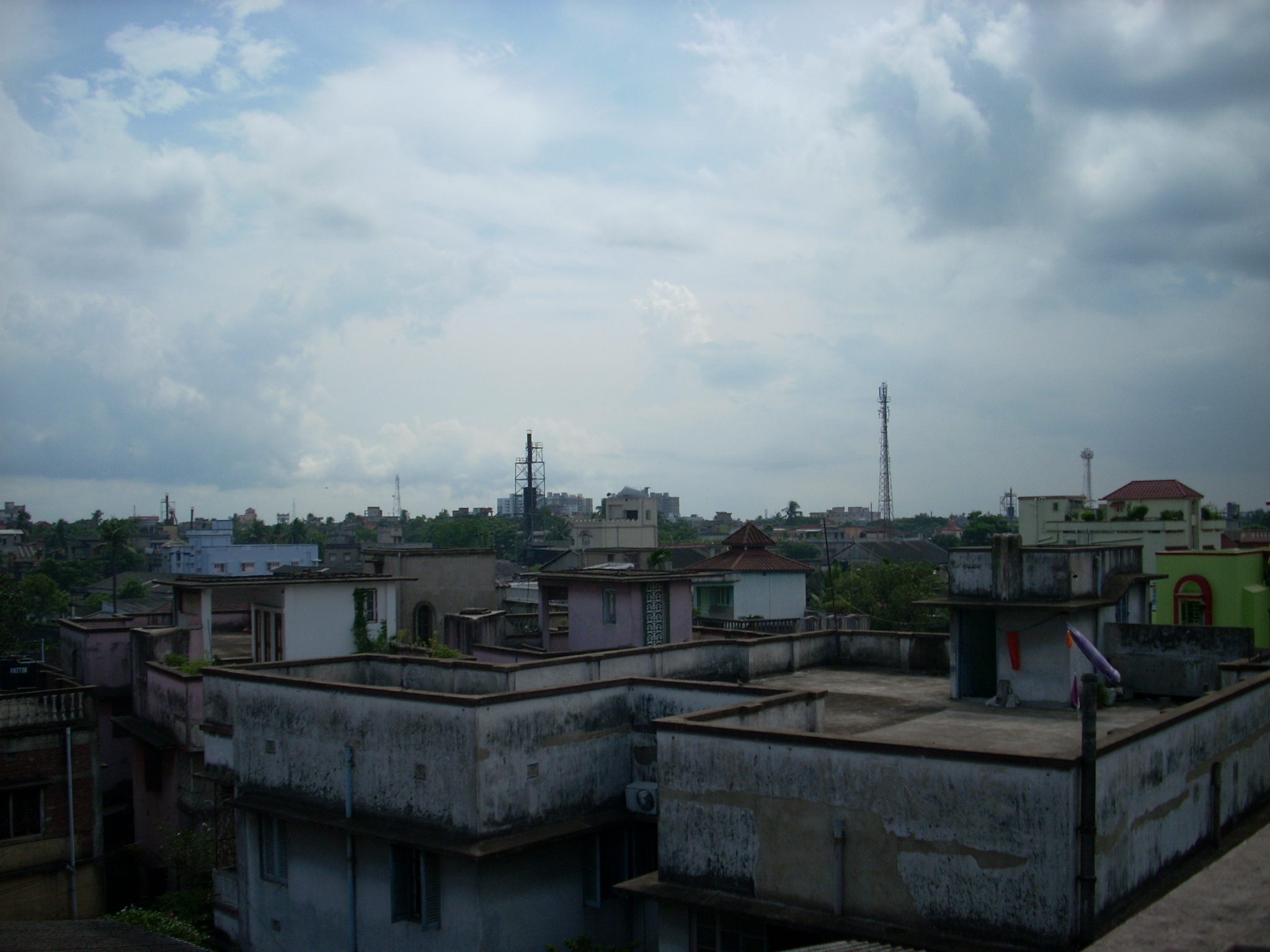

- Location in West Bengal, India Kadamtala (West Bengal) Kadamtala (India)
- Coordinates: 22°35′20″N 88°18′50″E
- Country: India
- State: West Bengal
- Division: Presidency
- District: Howrah
- City: Howrah
- Kolkata Metro: Howrah Maidan (under construction); Howrah (under construction)
- Municipal Corporation: Howrah Municipal Corporation
- Time zone: UTC+5:30 (IST)
- PIN: 711101, 711104
- Telephone code: +91 33
- Vehicle registration: WB
- HMC wards: 21, 22, 23, 24, 43
- Lok Sabha constituency: Howrah
- Vidhan Sabha constituency: Howrah Madhya and Shibpur

Kadamtala is a neighbourhood in Howrah of Howrah district in the Indian state of West Bengal. It is a part of the area covered by Kolkata Metropolitan Development Authority (KMDA). Kadamtala is under the jurisdiction of Bantra Police Station of Howrah City Police.

== History ==
Kadamtala was a part of Bhurshut kingdom. This area was mainly developed under British occupation when ceded by Nawab of Murshidabad after the Battle of Plassey. With the establishment of the Howrah Railway Terminus in 1854 started the most important phase of its industrial development. Flour mills were established in 1855, followed by jute mills and around the 1870s, there were five mills near Howrah Station. The Howrah–Shalimar Railway Section and the Shalimar Terminus were constructed in 1883. Kadamtala was also a major railway junction of Martin's Light Railways.

Kadamtala was turned into an industrial area during World War II. A high demand of iron lead to the establishment of a number of small and medium-sized iron-casting industries. Gradually the city of Howrah was called as Sheffield of Bengal when Mr. Alamohan Das established a large factory township named Dasnagar. A large number of machines/tools/precision instruments manufacturing factories were established.

All the above reasons result to a flow of population from rural belts of Howrah, Hooghly and Midnapur districts to this area to meet the high demand of labour. Gradually, this area has become a densely populated area with the location advantage of industries of Dasnagar in west, Howrah Railway Terminus in east.

The rapid growth of population and negligence of planned infrastructure of the British Government and then flux of people from Bangladesh (then East Pakistan) leads to a breakdown of infrastructure of unplanned and narrow roads. The economic decline of West Bengal after partition of India also causes a big blow to Howrah's famous jute and machine-tools industries.

== Recent developments ==
Currently Kadamtala is mainly a residential area, but still there exist significant number of private small scaled industrial infrastructures. The population is mainly divided into few economic classes. There is a working class who temporarily stay in this town and work in the small scaled iron-casting, machine tools and precision instruments industries. A number of people also work in different Government and Private service sectors. Also few are engaged with small-scaled businesses.

After the famous Vidyasagar Setu was established, this town has become well-connected with Kolkata by both Vidyasagar Setu and Howrah Bridge. Kadamtala is connected to Kona Expressway by Dr. Bholanath Chakraborty Sarani (Formerly Drainage Canal Road), which was built by Kolkata Metropolitan Development Authority (KMDA). Kona Expressway serves as a connector of Kolkata (via Vidyasagar Setu) to National Highway 16 and hence is a part of the Golden Quadrilateral project. At Nibra town of Howrah district, Kona Expressway joins with NH 16.

== Transport ==
=== Bus ===
Buses ply along Deshapran Shasmal Road (Panchanantala Road), Narasingha Dutta Road, New HIT Road, Belilious Road and Natabar Paul Road in Kadamtala.

==== Private Bus ====
- 63 Domjur – Howrah Station
- 72 Dumurjala – Park Circus
- 73 Dasnagar (C.T.I.) - Esplanade
- 75 Kadamtala - Esplanade
- E43 Dihibhurshut - Howrah Station
- E44 Rampur - Howrah Station
- E53 Narit - Howrah Station
- L3 Jhikhira/Muchighata - Howrah Station

==== Mini Bus ====
- 3 Kadamtala – Esplanade
- 3A Kamardanga – Esplanade
- 5 Japanigate – Salt Lake Sector-5
- 16 Domjur – Howrah Station
- 26 Unsani - Esplanade
- 27 Bankra – Park Circus
- 29 Tikiapara -- Salt Lake Sector-5
- 31 Makardaha - Khidirpur
- 34 Purash - Howrah Station
- 35 Hantal - Howrah Station
- 38 Dasnagar (C.T.I.) - Esplanade

==== CTC Bus ====
- C11A: Munsirhat- Howrah

==== Bus Routes without Numbers ====
- Kadamtala – New Town Ecospace
- Pancharul – Howrah Station
- Rajbalhat – Howrah Station
- Udaynarayanpur – Howrah Station
- Tarakeswar – Howrah Station

=== Train ===
Dasnagar railway station and Tikiapara railway station on South Eastern line are the nearest railway stations of Kadamtala. The nearest railway junction is Howrah Station.

== Education and sports ==
Sri Ramkrishna Sikshalaya, Tarasundari Balika Vidyabhaban, Bantra MSPC High School are well known schools in the locality for large numbers of good students. Kadamtala also has only one college in its neighborhood namely Narasinha Dutt College. Kadamtala also adds to sports excellence of Howrah known for the football talents like Sailen Manna.

== Problems ==
Even after all the improvement in the recent two decades the place is not free of the usual problems with Howrah. The amount of road space to the population in Howrah is too small compared to even smaller towns by population, such as Berhampur. The same problem applies to Kadamtala too. The drainage system is poor in this locality.
