= Santragachi Kedarnath Institution, Howrah =

High school in Howrah, India

Santragachi Kedarnath Institution, Howrah (SKNI)
- Logo of the institution

Location
- 181 Sastri Narendra Nath Ganguly Road. near Ramrajatala; Santragachi; Howrah, West Bengal; India; 22°35′6.417″N 88°18′13.566″E

Information
- Former name: Santragachi Minor School
- School type: Government sponsored, Higher Secondary
- Mottoes: Those, who respect get knowledge
- Established: 1857; originally founded 1870; as Santragachi Minor School; 17 July 1925; as Santragachi Kedarnath Institution
- Founder: Kedarnath Bhattacharya, Manmatanath Seth, Mahendranath Kar
- School code: F1-116, 106071
- Head teacher: Tapobrata Basu
- Student to teacher ratio: 40
- Classes offered: V-XII
- Language: Bengali
- Schedule type: Day
- Classrooms: ~40
- Yearbook: "Pujar Ful"
- Affiliations: West Bengal Board of Secondary Education and West Bengal Council of Higher Secondary Education
- Alumni: Notable alumni
- Website: www.sknireunion.com

Santragachi Kedarnath Institution (or Santragachi K.N. Institution) is a government sponsored, Bengali language, higher secondary school in Howrah in the state of West Bengal, India. The first Bengali language medium school of Howrah district, it was founded as Santragachi Minor School by Kedarnath Bhattacharya in 1857, and became the Santragachi Kedarnath Institution in 1925. Ashutosh Mukherjee, the second Indian Vice-Chancellor of the University of Calcutta laid the foundation stone in 1920.

The school shares the same campus with Santragachi Kedarnath Institution (for Girls) and Santragachi Kedarnath Institution Primary Section (Co-ed) (I-IV).

== History ==
The Santragachi and Ramrajatala areas in Howrah were previously undeveloped. There were only two high schools; "Santragachi Madhya Engreji School" and "Chakraberia Madhyamik School". Both were English medium and aided by the Government. A "toll" or "pathsala" was started in 1770 by the Bhattacharya family. In 1800, Gourikanta Bhattacharya expanded the toll which existed up to 1860. In 1857, zamindar Baboo Kedarnath Bhattacharya established a vernacular Bengali medium school with the help of Government aid. It was the first vernacular Bengali medium school to receive Government aid. In 1864, this school was demolished by cyclone, and was removed to the house of Kedarnath Bhattacharya, where it stayed for two years. At a cost of ₹4000/- a new pucca building was constructed for the school. In 1870, this school was amalgamated with Santragachi Madhya Engraji School and named the Santragachi Minor School. An educationist and zamindar, Manmatanath Seth, wanted to build a high school for the children of the locality, so he donated a grant of money. The Kar brothers (Mahendranath Kar, Upendranath Kar and Narendranath Kar) donated land, but Manmatanath Seth died before the High school could be constructed. The Kar brothers built the school using the donations for the students of Santragachi Minor School and in November 1925, this was named "Kedarnath Institution" in the name of Baboo Kedarnath Bhattacharya who had died in 1915. The foundation year is now considered as 1925.

The foundation stone was laid by the vice-chancellor and professor of Ashutosh College, Ashutosh Mukherjee on 17 July 1920. From 1925, the newly named institution started functioning with 225 students in six classrooms. In 1926, the class for the ninth standard started with the temporary permission of Calcutta University, and in 1927, after the completion of the tenth standard, the school's students were sent for board exams the first time. In 1933, the school received its permanent affiliation from the West Bengal Board. In 1960, the school was recognised by the University Of Calcutta, to impact Elementary Scientific knowledge and Elementary Mechanics to the students.

== Infrastructure ==
The school's main building consists of Ram Charan Sett Block, Guest Keen Williams Block, Rupen Kar Memorial Block, Upendranath Kar Block, Sarba Sikhya Bhaban, Ramkrishna Das Block and Satish Chandra Block. The main building contains about 25 classrooms, and Chemistry, Physics, Geography, Optics, Biology and two Computer laboratories. A smart room is under construction.

In front of the school there is a small playground having an open stage Bhagini Nivedita Muktomoncho. In the backside of the building, there is a big playground (over 2900 m^{2} or 31000 feet²) used for sports and other functional purposes. Besides the field, the three storied Jubilee Block contains 6 classrooms, a library and a hall with adequate sound system and capacity of taking about 150 students. An auditorium is planned on the third floor of this block, which is under construction.

== Academics and extra-curriculum ==
=== Affiliations and curriculum ===
The school is affiliated to West Bengal Board of Secondary Education for V-X and West Bengal Council of Higher Secondary Education for XI-XII. In the higher secondary, there are three streams: Arts (Humanities), Commerce and Science.

The Arts (Humanities) department offers Political Science, Philosophy, Geography, History, Sanskrit, Modern Computer Application, Education, Nutrition, Environmental Studies and Mathematics.

The Science department offers Physics, Chemistry, Mathematics, Biological Science, Computer Science, Modern Computer Application, Geography, Nutrition, Environmental Studies and Agriculture (vocational subject).

The department of Commerce offers Accountancy, Business studies, Costing and Taxation, Commercial Law and preliminary auditing, Mathematics, Environmental Studies and Modern Computer Application.

=== Sports, scout and events ===
The school's football team is one of the most reputed teams in the interschool football competitions in Howrah. It participates in M P Cup and Reliance Foundation Youth Sports National School Championships. The school won the Bandhuta's Amit Bosu Smriti Amantran Football Competition in 2013 (defeating Howrah Zilla School in final), in 2018 and in 2020. In 2018, the school also won "Barkuni Smiti Cup" held at Jagacha High School. The school has also its own tournament and other sports events.

Saraswati Puja is a special event at this school. The school received numerous reputed awards for its famous Saraswati Puja (ie. "The Telegraph" Second Best Saraswati puja award in 2014, Eisamay Palaspriya Samman Award in 2018 etc.). The school too hosts and participates in various quiz, drama or debate shows.

The consumer committee spreads awareness about and the Reunion Committee organizes a reunion and other alumni events. National Green Corps was formed in 2006, under a Governmental Campaign. Successfully running up to 2013, the activities have been stopped.

The National Cadet Corps (NCC) trainings were offered previously. It was controlled by 41 Bengal Battalion NCC, Howrah-03. But the programme was again replaced by scout activities.

The school's scout group is under The Bharat Scouts and Guides. The group control and manage school programmes and take part in various contests, competitions and exhibitions formed in school as well as outside. Every year, numerous scout camps take place in various places. Many students from this scout group have been chosen for the Rajyapuraskar and Principal Scout award, the highest awards for scouters. The trainings have been conducted by many notable scoutmasters like Bimal Kar (during 1947), Kali Sankar Mukherjee etc.

== Notable alumni ==
- Kanailal Bhattacharyya, politician
- Santanu Chaudhuri, researcher at Argonne National Laboratory
- Raviranjan Maitra, actor and producer
- Rudranil Ghosh, actor and politician
- Jatu Lahiri, politician
- Jagannath Bhattacharya, politician and physician

== See also ==
- List of schools in Howrah
