= Tikiapara =

- Neighbourhood
- Panchdeep Tower at Belilious Park, Tikiapara

- Location in West Bengal, India Tikiapara (West Bengal) Tikiapara (India)
- Coordinates: 22°35′43″N 88°19′26″E
- Country: India
- State: West Bengal
- Division: Presidency
- District: Howrah
- City: Howrah
- Metro Station: Howrah Maidan and Howrah

Government
  - Type: Municipal Corporation
  - Body: Howrah Municipal Corporation

Languages
  - Official: Bengali, Hindi, English Urdu
- Time zone: UTC+5:30 (IST)
- PIN: 711101
- Telephone code: +91 33
- Vehicle registration: WB
- HMC wards: 19, 20, 22
- Lok Sabha constituency: Howrah
- Vidhan Sabha constituency: Howrah Madhya and Shibpur
- Website: wb.gov.in

Tikiapara is a neighbourhood in Howrah of Howrah district in the Indian state of West Bengal. It is adjacent to Dasnagar, Belgachia,Kadamtala, Panchanantala & Howrah Maidan and on its eastern side lies the Salkia and Pilkhana region. It is a part of the area covered by Kolkata Metropolitan Development Authority (KMDA).

Tikiapara also has a railway station by its name. It lies on the South-Eastern Railway. Local trains connects it to Dasnagar, Ramrajatala, Santragachhi, Balitikuri, Andul and Howrah Railway Station, which in turn will connect it to the presently under-construction Howrah Metro Station in the future.

The economy of this region is dependent on the iron and casting industry mostly small and medium-sized, which makes it an industrial region of the city. Large part of the population serve as a work force for businesses located in Kolkata.

The Bypass Road will connect tikiapara to the Howrah Maidan Metro Station which will serve as a major transportation boost to the neighbourhood.

Tikiapara is under the jurisdiction of Howrah Police Station of Howrah City Police. It also has local Police Station namely Tikipara Police Station located in Fari.

== Railway colony ==
There is a big railway colony built during late nineteenth century along Tikiapara railway station beside Sailen Manna Street (Formerly Bypass Road). It is managed by South Eastern Railway. The station code is TKPR. It is the next station of Howrah Station on South Eastern line. It is a flood-prone area. Although no express train stops at this station, all local and passenger trains stop at Tikiapara.

== Places of attraction ==
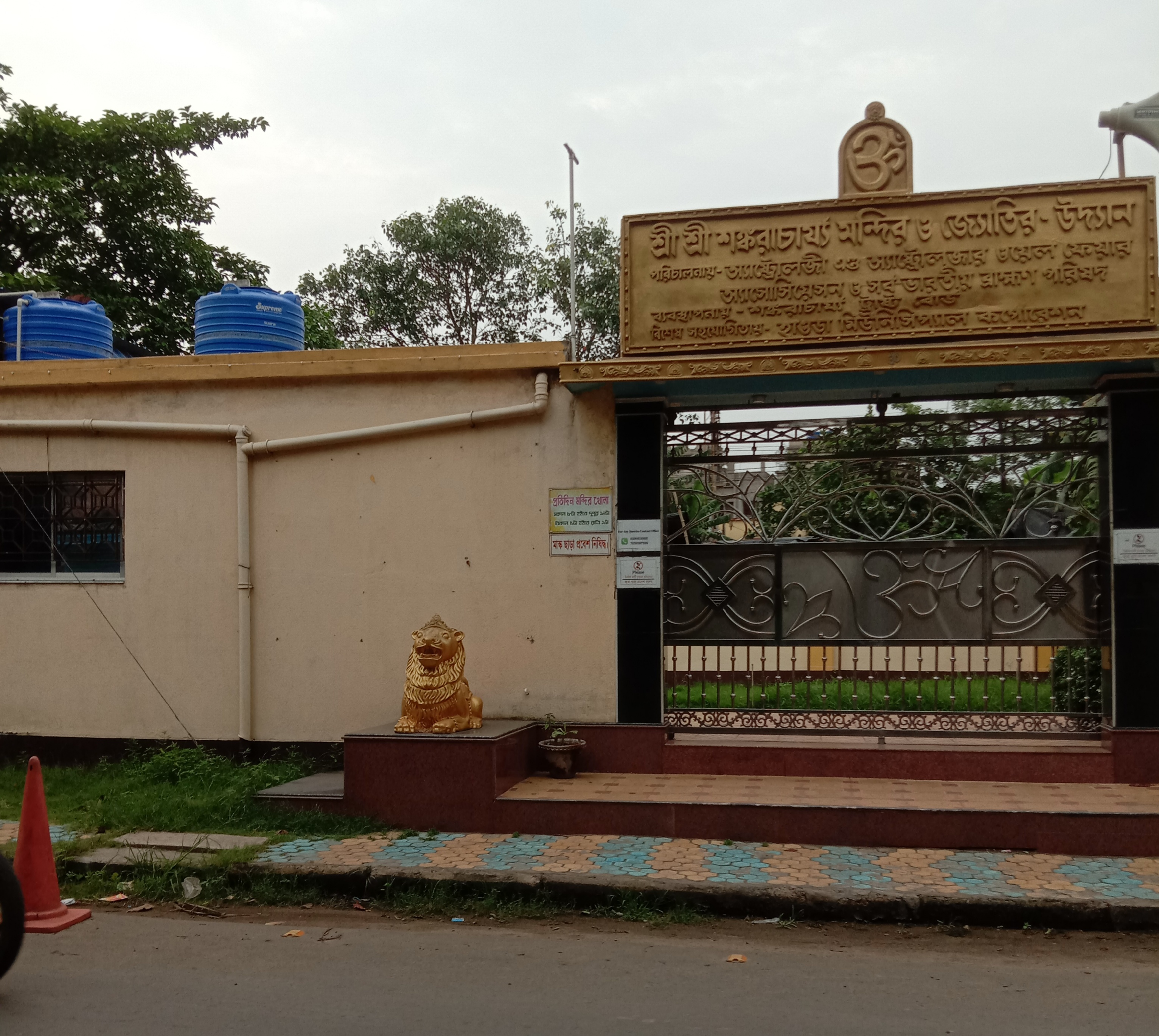
Shankaracharya temple and astrological training center at Tikiapara

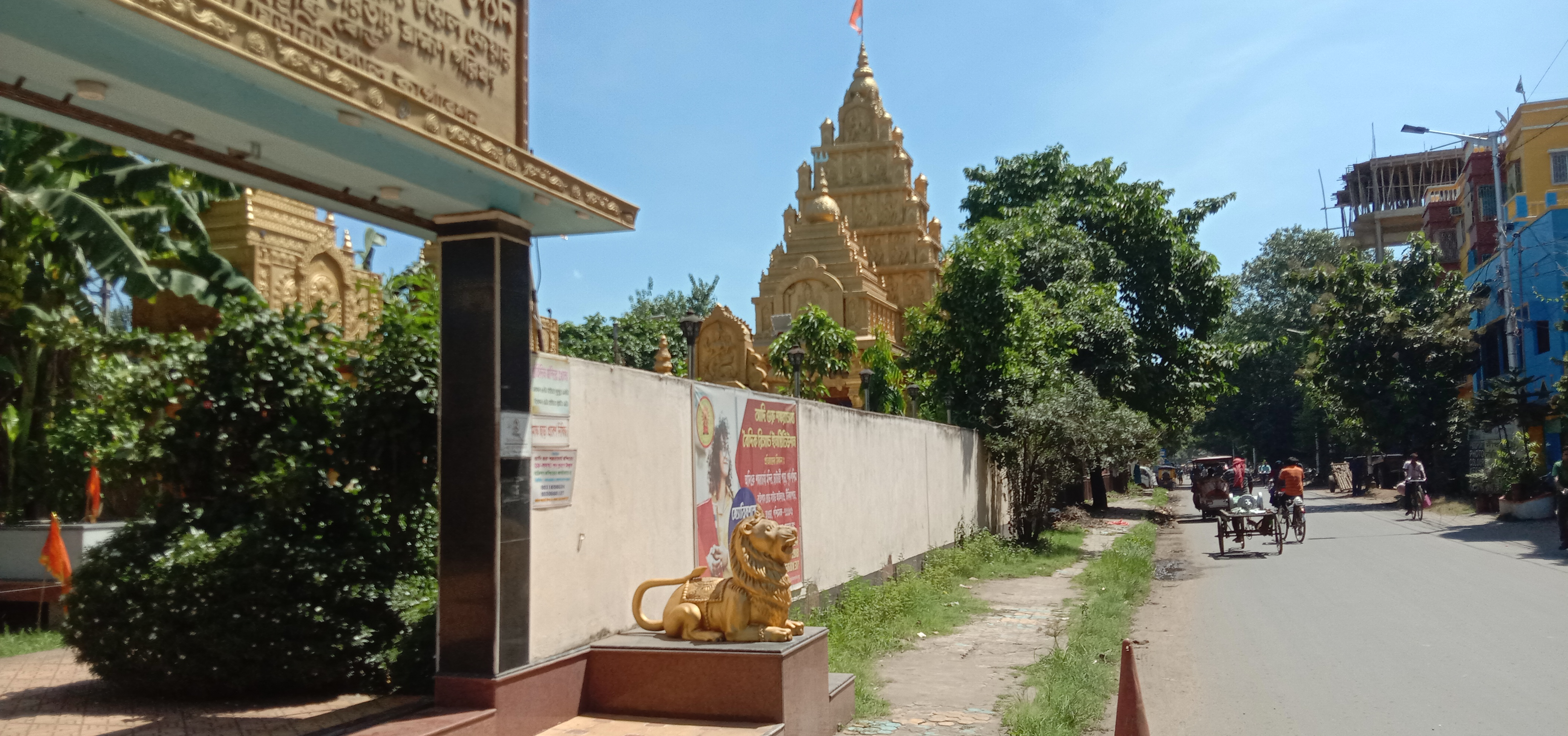
Shankaracharya Temple on Sailen Manna Road, Tikiapara.

The most attractive place of Tikiapara is the Belilious Park, an amusement park. As of now, it is opened only for morning joggers, within the park there is a pond and the trees around here provide greenery to the region. A marriage hall is also present here for marriage events. A new tower is also under construction namely "Panchdeeep Tower", which after construction will be the tallest Structure in the whole city of Howrah.

Food

This region has a lot of biryani shops selling mutton, chicken and beef biryani. It also has small shops selling puri, samosa, kabab, pakora and rolls. Sweets are also available in many shops. Due to the ethnic diversity in the region, there is a variety of different cuisines.

== People ==
Tikiapara is a region of mixed cultures and languages with Urdu speaking Muslim community forming a majority of the population. Most Muslims live in the central part of Tikiapara starting from Bibi Masjid continuing till Tikiapara Police station.

The region has experienced a rapid rise in population, the urban infrastructure has not been able to cope up with it which has made it one of the most densely populated neighborhoods of Howrah.

In recent times, real estate business has made rapid stride in terms of infrastructure development.

While Hindus are concentrated mostly on the outskirts of in and around the central Tikiapara region. Most north Indian Hindus (Biharis and Marwaris) are concentrated in the Ashu Bose Lane region.While Bengali Hindus resides west of Belilious Park till Kadamtala.

The most widely spoken languages here are Hindi, Urdu and Bengali. While most of the people are able to understand and speak in Bengali as well.

Generally, Tikiapara can be divided into two parts i.e. north and south Tikiapara with Belilious Road intersecting it into two uneven parts. There are lot of small scale industries in and around the fringes of Tikiapara. Majority of them are foundry and casting industry. Iron and steel products making small scale factories are also present. Small Printing presses can also be found.

Development is happening at a rapid rate. Income diversification is a key to people's growth. Literacy rate is also on the upward slope with more parents encouraging their children to basic education.

In Tikiapara, the rapid population increase and the prevalence of male-dominated industries have led to significant challenges for women, especially housewives. Despite their crucial role in managing households and raising families, housewives often face societal disregard and are not given the respect they deserve. The lack of financial contribution is a primary reason behind this, as they are traditionally expected to focus solely on family care. This one-dimensional perception undermines their value, leading to a lack of confidence and diminished self-esteem.

Studies reveal that in 6 out of 10 households, housewives experience low self-esteem due to being overlooked and disrespected. Their contributions are often taken for granted, as they do not directly participate in income generation. This systemic undervaluation not only affects their mental well-being but also hinders their ability to explore opportunities for personal and professional growth.

Level of hygiene has drastically improved. Rapid urbanization changed people's perspective.

== Education ==
The oldest educational institution of Tikiapara is Howrah Muslim High School which is serving the basic requirements of primary, secondary and higher secondary education. The medium of instruction is basically Urdu. However, English and Bengali are also used as second and third language. St Joseph day school, Holy child and Sacred heart are the English medium schools.

Upper Middle Families tend to send their kids to St. Thomas church or Maria's Day School.

Now the educational system is being refined with lot of young children attending schools. The newly opened Narayana School provides high class primary and secondary and Higher Education in science stream as well.

Other educational institutions of Tikiapara include Sir Syed Ahmed High School, Tikiapara Muslim Girls High School and some other primary schools. The future of English-based education is being nourished under the tender roofs of Samaritan Mission School and Rebecca Belilious Institution, initiated by notable social worker Mamoon Sir. The institution has been granted the status of a High School and efforts are on to concretize this idea of establishing a school having all three streams- arts, commerce and science.
