= Ramrajatala =

Neighbourhood in Howrah

- Neighbourhood
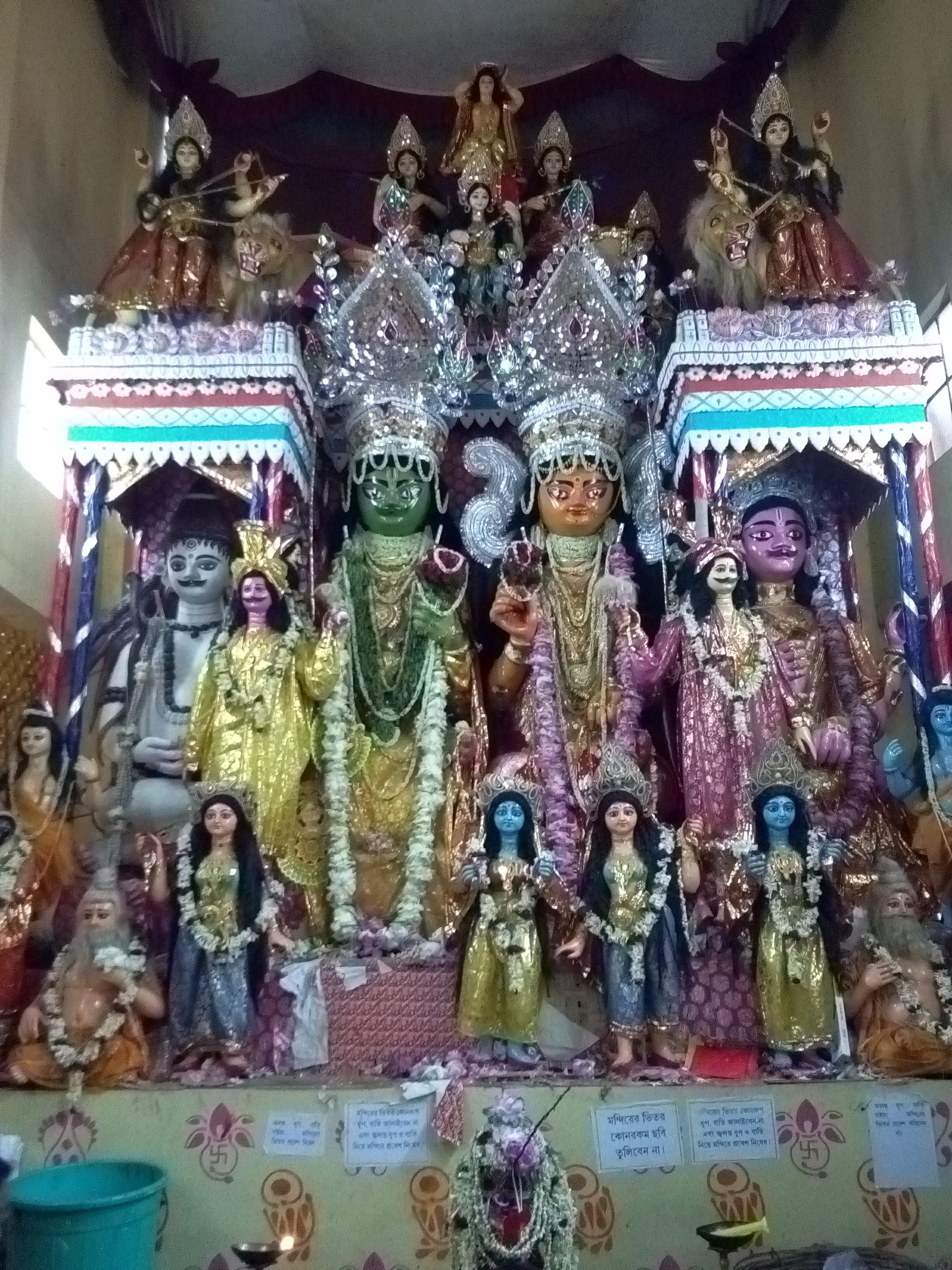
- Idols of Rama, Sita and other deities at the Rama Mandir in Ramrajatala.

- Location in West Bengal, India Ramrajatala (West Bengal) Ramrajatala (India)
- Coordinates: 22°35′18″N 88°17′46″E
- Country: India
- State: West Bengal
- Division: Presidency
- District: Howrah
- City: Howrah
- Metro Station: Howrah Maidan(under construction) and Howrah(under construction)Belepole(Planned), Betor(Planned)

Government
  - Type: Municipal Corporation
  - Body: Howrah Municipal Corporation

Languages
  - Official: Bengali, English
- Time zone: UTC+5:30 (IST)
- PIN: 711104
- Telephone code: +91 33
- Vehicle registration: WB
- HMC wards: 44, 47, 48, 49
- Lok Sabha constituency: Howrah
- Vidhan Sabha constituency: Howrah Dakshin and Shibpur
- Climate: Normal (Köppen)
- Avg. summer temperature: 35 °C (95 °F)
- Avg. winter temperature: 15 °C (59 °F)

Ramrajatala is a neighbourhood in Howrah of Howrah district in the Indian state of West Bengal. It is a part of the area covered by Kolkata Metropolitan Development Authority (KMDA). Ramrajatala is under the jurisdiction of Chatterjeehat Police Station, Dasnagar Police Station and Jagacha Police Station of Howrah City Police.

== History ==
The name of the area comes from the presence of a temple dedicated to Lord Rama and three months long worship is undertaken by the people of the locality every year at the temple. This tradition of worship of Lord Rama has been continuing for about 3 centuries here.

Ayodhyaram Choudhury, the zamindar started Rama puja first time in this area.It is situated near the house of Mr.Soumik Adak Choudhury. According to him, he got some divine instructions to worship Lord Rama. After that he started a huge Barowari Puja of Lord Rama. That Puja got a massive popularly in the passage of time and the locality was named after it Ramrajatala.

But during that time, Saraswati Puja was very famous in that area and the villagers used to enjoy the same a lot from previous 300 years. So some villagers those were the fond of the Saraswati Puja opposed the Ram Puja. The two groups came to a conclusion after numerous discussions that Ram Puja would be done and the Goddess of Wisdom Saraswati would be placed on the top of Lord Ram & Sita. From that day the customary started to cut the bamboo from the bamboo groove of Sasthitala and perform the very first Puja of those bamboos at Choudhury Para Shiv Mandir on the day of Saraswati Puja. During the initial days the Puja the fair firstly held for three days. After that it continued for a fortnight and then up to a month. Now Ram Puja starts on Ramnavami in Chaitra-Baisakh month and continues up to the last Sunday of Shravan month. It is longest running fair in West Bengal.

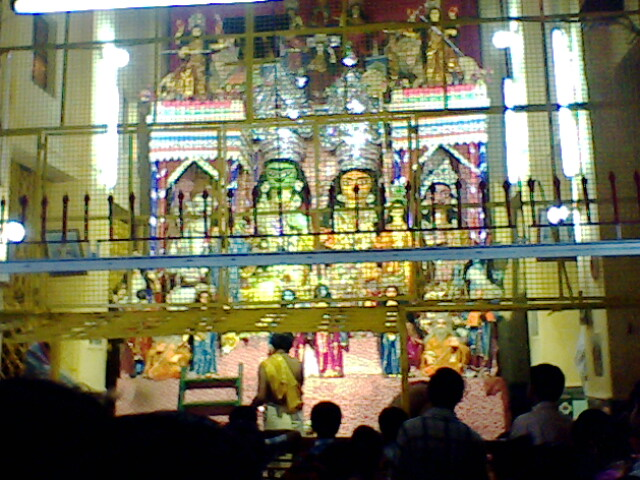
The idols of Ram and Sita in Ramrajatala

== Locality ==
Ramrajatala is one of the oldest parts of the city of Howrah. This is a densely populated area in the southern part of Howrah city. Situated in the centre of this area, Ramrajatala Bazar is the most populated place.

The area is in need of development in domains like road improvements and drainage system because waterlogging is a major problem in this part of Howrah. For this water stands here even after a slight rain in the monsoon. That creates huge problem for the people of the locality.

== Transport ==
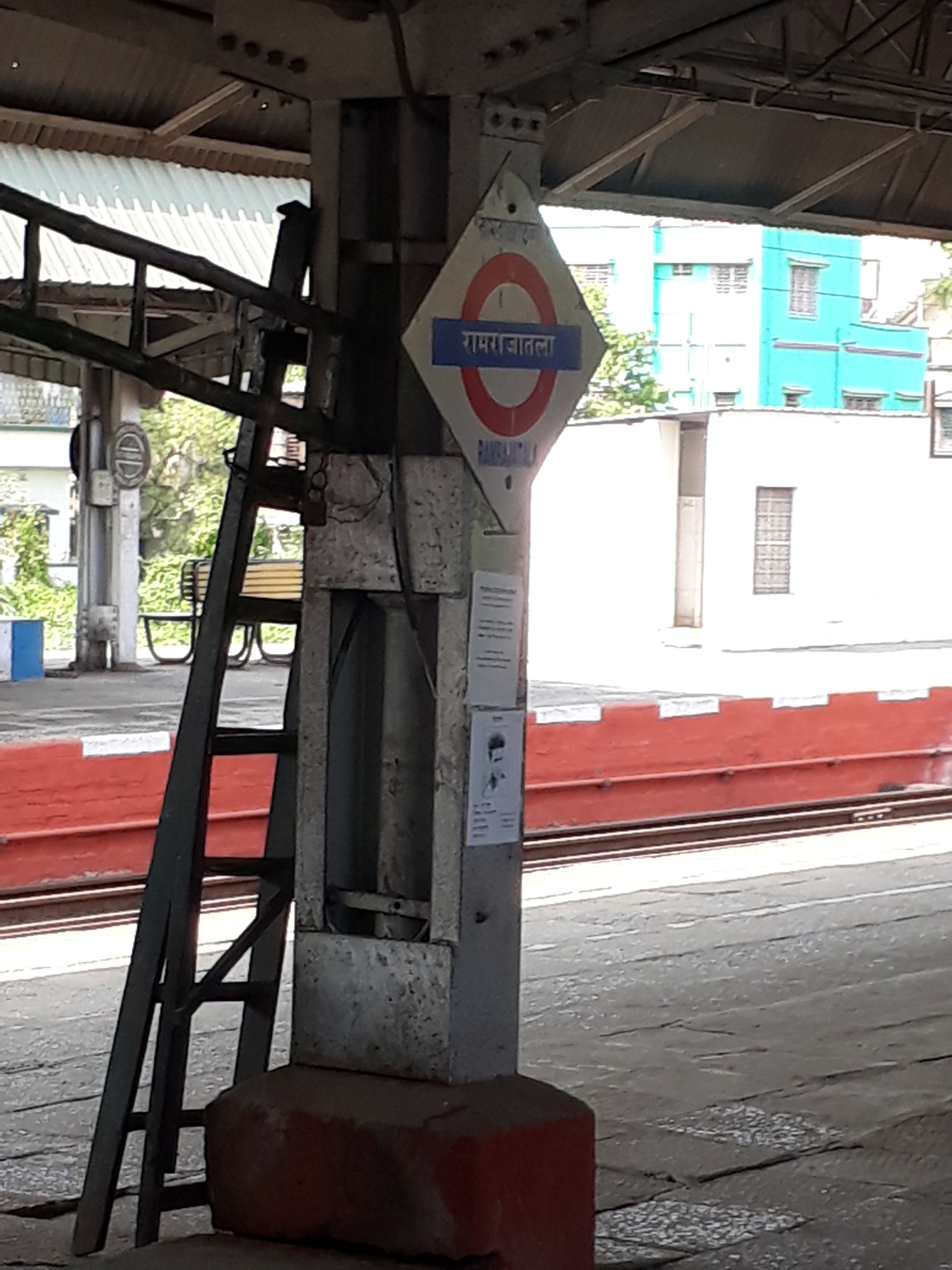
Ramrajatala railway station

Ramrajatala railway station is a small but important railway station on the South Eastern line. A large number of people travel from nearby villages and towns through this station. Santragachi railway station is the nearest railway junction-cum-terminus.

An important road, Kona Expressway, passes nearby connecting Mumbai Road (NH 16) with Second Hooghly Bridge to Kolkata. This is an important connection for transportation to Kolkata as well as to different suburban areas like Bally, Domjur, Amta, Uluberia, Bagnan, Digha etc.

52 no. Private Bus starts running from here (along Ramcharan Sett Road/Mahendra Bhattacharya Road), between Ramrajatala (Rama Mandir) and Esplanade via Howrah Station every ten minutes.

In the year 1971, a metro line was projected in Calcutta Metro under Metropolitan Transport Project (MTP). The line is Bidhannagar-Ramrajatala (now as Kolkata Metro Line 2, Truncated until Howrah Maidan).

If Santragachi metro happens, then Belepole and Bethore will have a metro station to serve Ramrajatala.

== Places of interest ==
- Rama Mandir (Rama Temple)

A fair is held during the four month long puja. This is popular, particularly during the bisarjan (immersion ceremony) that is the last journey on the last Sunday in Shraavana.

- Shankar Math

A Shankaracharya Temple with a Gurukul styled school having a residential ashram for the poor and homeless students. There is a huge playground in front of here.

- Lake Land Country Club

Situated on Kona Expressway, it is a place for shooting Tollywood movies, auditions for many national talent hunt contests are held here. It was previously known as Rashid Park.

- Santragachi Jheel

It attracts many migratory Siberian birds such as lesser whistling duck from December to February every year.

- Dumurjala Indoor Stadium

A few distance away on Dr. Bholanath Chakraborty Sarani (Formerly Drainage Canal Road), it is an indoor stadium with plays host to several prominent talent hunt contests and sports activities.

- Bani Niketan Public Library

A big public library in Ramrajatala, containing long range of books, hosts many competitions also.

=== Nearby Localities ===
Some of the localities in or near Ramrajatala are:

- Hatpukur, small locality near Ramrajatala
- Ichapur, neighbourhood beside Ramrajatala
- Jagacha, neighbourhood beside Ramrajatala
- Chaudhurypara, small locality in Ramrajatala, in past times zamindar Ayodhyaram Chaudhury lived here
- Bhattacharjeepara, small locality beside Ramrajatala, in past times the Bhattacharjee family lived here
- Kamardanga, neighbourhood beside Ramrajatala
- Nandipara, small locality in Ramrajatala
- Sasthitala, small locality in Ramrajatala
- Doser Pallee, small locality in Ramrajatala
- Satashi, neighbourhood beside Ramrajatala
- Balitikuri, industrial locality near Ramrajatala

== Educational institutions ==
- Dr. Kanailal Bhattacharya College, established in 1985, named after Kanailal Bhattacharyya, ex-minister.
- Industrial Training Institute, Howrah Homes.
- Santragachi Kedarnath Institution, Howrah is a notable high school. Sir Ashutosh Mukherjee laid the foundation stone of this school in 1925. Santragachi Kedarnath Institution (For girls) is the sister school of this school.
