= Jagacha =

Jagacha Jagachha
- Neighbourhood
- Location in West Bengal, India Jagacha (West Bengal) Jagacha (India)
- Coordinates: 22.59°N 88.29°E
- Country: India
- State: West Bengal
- Division: Presidency
- District: Howrah
- City: Howrah

Government
  - Type: Municipal Corporation
  - Body: Howrah Municipal Corporation

Languages
  - Official: Bengali, English
- Time zone: UTC+5:30 (IST)
- PIN: 711104, 711112
- Telephone code: +91 33
- Vehicle registration: WB
- HMC ward: 47
- Lok Sabha constituency: Howrah
- Vidhan Sabha constituency: Shibpur
- Website: wb.gov.in

Jagacha (also known as Jagachha) is a neighbourhood in Howrah of Howrah district in the Indian state of West Bengal. It is a part of the area covered by Kolkata Metropolitan Development Authority (KMDA). Jagacha is under the jurisdiction of Jagacha Police Station of Howrah City Police.

== Geography ==
Jagacha is located at 22.59°N 88.29°E. It is adjacent to Ramrajatala, Santragachi, Balitikuri and Bankra.

== Locality ==
Government of India Press, Santragachi as well as a massive residential complex of central government employees popularly known as Press Quarter is located in Jagacha. CGHS (Central Government Health Scheme) for Central Government employees also located in this area nearby Press Quarter Lake.

Railway quarters in formal Anglo Indian Colony Sahebpara is a place of interest.

Jagacha Shakti Sangha is a major local organisation with many facilities for local youth that organizes various events throughout the year.

Jagacha was a hub of iron and small engineering industry which has lost its glory.

The very popular Durga Puja celebrate at Satashi Pal Para Durga Mandir (Jolar Math). This area every year affected due to heavy rain and illegally settled encroachment on the drainage systems and small ponds.

Press Quarter Lake is one of the largest wetlands in the area and is known for its rich biodiversity, including butterflies, birds, fishes, snakes, and rodents. The wetland also holds cultural importance, as local communities gather there every year to celebrate the Hindu festival of Chhath Puja.

In Jagacha, many local languages peoples are speaking like, Hindi, Bangla, English, Kuruk, Kurmali, Oi-chiki, Tamil, Telugu, and Maghi.

== Education ==
The medium of instruction is Bengali, English or Hindi. There are many schools in Jagacha: Jagacha High School, Satashi High School (H.S), Kendriya Vidyalaya Santragachi, Jagacha Girls High School. There are Computer Training School Jagacha Smile Welfare Society Vocational Training Institute for Computer and Soft Skill (Central Gov. Recognize [NCVT]) at Jagacha Arabindo Sangha as well as Santi Computer is one of the popular computer center near the P. M. Shri Kendriya Vidyalaya (Santragachi).

== Research Organisation ==
Margastha Research Foundation located in the neighborhood of the Jagacha area, particularly in Balitikuri. This NGO dedicated to environmental conservation, biodiversity protection, education, and scientific research. The foundation offers internships and research opportunities in Biodiversity and Conservation, Botany, Zoology, Environmental Science, Ecology related life science disciplines. Through fieldwork, research projects, and community-based conservation initiatives, it provides students and young researchers with practical experience while contributing to biodiversity conservation and sustainable development.

== Notable People ==
- Ranjan Shaw
- Subham Prasad Gupta

== Religious Places ==
In Jagacha, several HIndu Temples have been established by local residents (Bihari and Bengali proples) including Maa Sitola Mandir, Sri Sri Shani Graharaj O Dakshina Kali Mandir, Jagodhatri Mondir, Hanuman Mandir (Napit Para), and Satashi Maa Kali Mandir. Alongside the Santhal tribes small sacred forest also found in press quarter lake area.

== Festivals ==
Jagacha is the hub of cultural diversity in Howrah. The most common festivals are celebrated by the Santhal and Oraon tribes are Karma Puja, Sohrai and others. The Durga Puja and Kali Puja is the most attraction for this place throughout the Howrah City.

== Healthcare Facilities ==
Jagacha has both government and private healthcare facilities that provide primary medical care, diagnostic services, medical consultations, and nursing care to residents of the locality and neighbouring areas. The major healthcare facilities in the area include the following:

- Jagacha Prathamic Swastha Kendra
- Dr. D N Saha Memorial Nursing Home
- Jeevan Deep Nursing Home
- Lady Mariya Nursing Bureau - Howrah & Kolkata
- MEDI POINT HEALTH CARE-Diagnostic and Doctor Clinic in Jagacha (Orthopedic Doctor, Neuro Doctor, Blood Test Lab)

== Medical Shops ==
Medical Shops are the backbone of any residential area like Jagacha, serving as a crucial part of local healthcare infrastructure. Below is the precise list of pharmacies serving in this locality:

- Ganesh Medical
- Manashi Medical Stores
- Matrichaya Medical
- Shuva Medical Hall
- G.K. Medical

== Transport ==
Santragachi Junction, Bankra Nayabaz, Balitikuri and Ramrajatala railway station on the South Eastern line (Kolkata Suburban Railway) connects the town to Howrah Station and other suburban areas of Howrah district.

E-rickshaw available from Santragachi Railway Station to Ashutosh Ghosh Lane, Press Quarter, Bharat Mata Club Railway Gate, Sudar Para, Satashi School, Bankra Police Fari and Satashi Pal Para.
