= Kedarnath Bhattacharya =

Babu Kedarnath Bhattacharya
- Born: 1822; Ramrajatala, Howrah, Bengal Presidency, British India
- Died: 1915 (aged 92–93); Howrah, Bengal Presidency, British India
- Term: 1884—1915
- Predecessor: Mr E C Craster
- Successor: Baboo Mahendranath Ray
- Political party: All India National Congress
- Children: Mahesh Bhattacharya
- Father: Ramachandra Bhattacharya

Baboo Kedarnath Bhattacharya (1822-1915) was an influential zamindar, financier and the first Indian vice-chairman of Howrah Municipal Corporation.

== First Indian vice-chairman and chairman of Howrah ==
Kedarnath Bhattacharya was the first Indian elected vice-chairman. In 1884, he became vice-chairman with a huge majority in Howrah Municipal Corporation. In 1886, when Mr. E C Craster stepped down, Babu Upendra Chandra was elected as chairman. But due to some discrepancy in his election, Upendra Chandra's chairmanship was cancelled and Kedarnath Bhattacharya had to officiate in his position for a few years. After some years, nearly from 1890 the district magistrate was appointed as chairman upto 1916, until Babu Mahendranath Roy won the elections with a landslide majority. He was also an elected commissioner at word no 10.

== Other works ==
- Kedarnath Bhattacharya had organised the first All India National Congress meeting at the Howrah Town Hall on 29 August 1891. The meeting was presided over by Surendranath Banerjee.
- Kedarnath Bhattacharya made Howrah's first vernacular Bengali medium school in Santragachi in 1857. But the school was demolished by cyclone in 1864. Afterwards classes were held at his own home with his own money. Then with a government aid a new building was constructed and the school was mixed up with Santragachi Madhya Engreji Vidhyalaya. The school is now currently named as Santragachi Kedarnath Institution, Howrah.
