= Mahendranath Ray =

Indian barrister, politician and educationist (1861–1925)

The Hon'ble Babu Mahendra Nath Ray CIE, HonFRS, FRASB, FIAS
- বাবু মহেন্দ্রনাথ রায়
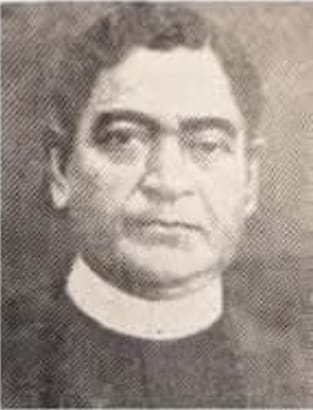
- Born: 29 October 1861; Howrah, Bengal Presidency, British India
- Died: 16 August 1925 (aged 63); Calcutta, Bengal Presidency, British India
- Citizenship: British Raj
- Education: Howrah Zilla School
- Alma mater: Presidency College, Calcutta
- Occupations: Lawyer, Educationist, Politician
- Organization: Indian National Congress
- Spouse: Prabodhmayee Debi
- Parents: Babu Girijaprasanna Ray (father); Phul Kumari Debi (mother)
- Family: Zamindar Ray Family of Tajpur
- Awards: Order of the Indian Empire (CIE); Honorary Fellow of the Royal Society (HonFRS); Fellow of the The Asiatic Society (FRASB); Fellow of the Indian Association for the Cultivation of Science (FIAS)

The Honourable Babu Mahendranath Ray CIE HonFRS FRASB FIAS (1861–1925), was an Indian lawyer, independence activist, social worker, mathematician, educationist and a politician. He was involved in the Indian freedom movement and was the first Indian elected chairperson of the Howrah Municipal corporation. He was one of the founders of Asutosh College in Calcutta and was one of the most influential people of Howrah. For his political works, commendable legal career and contributions to society, he was awarded the Companion of the Indian Empire in 1911 at the Delhi Durbar.

== Early life ==
He was born on 29 October 1861, in an aristocratic Mahishya family of Tajpur, located in present-day Amta police station area of Howrah district. The Ray family of Tajpur, were the Zamindars of Amta. His father's name was Girija Prasanna Ray, and his mother was Phul Kumari Debi. Mahendranath lost his father at an early age, and as a result, he was raised with great care and affection under the strict supervision of his grandfather Babu Jadunath Ray.

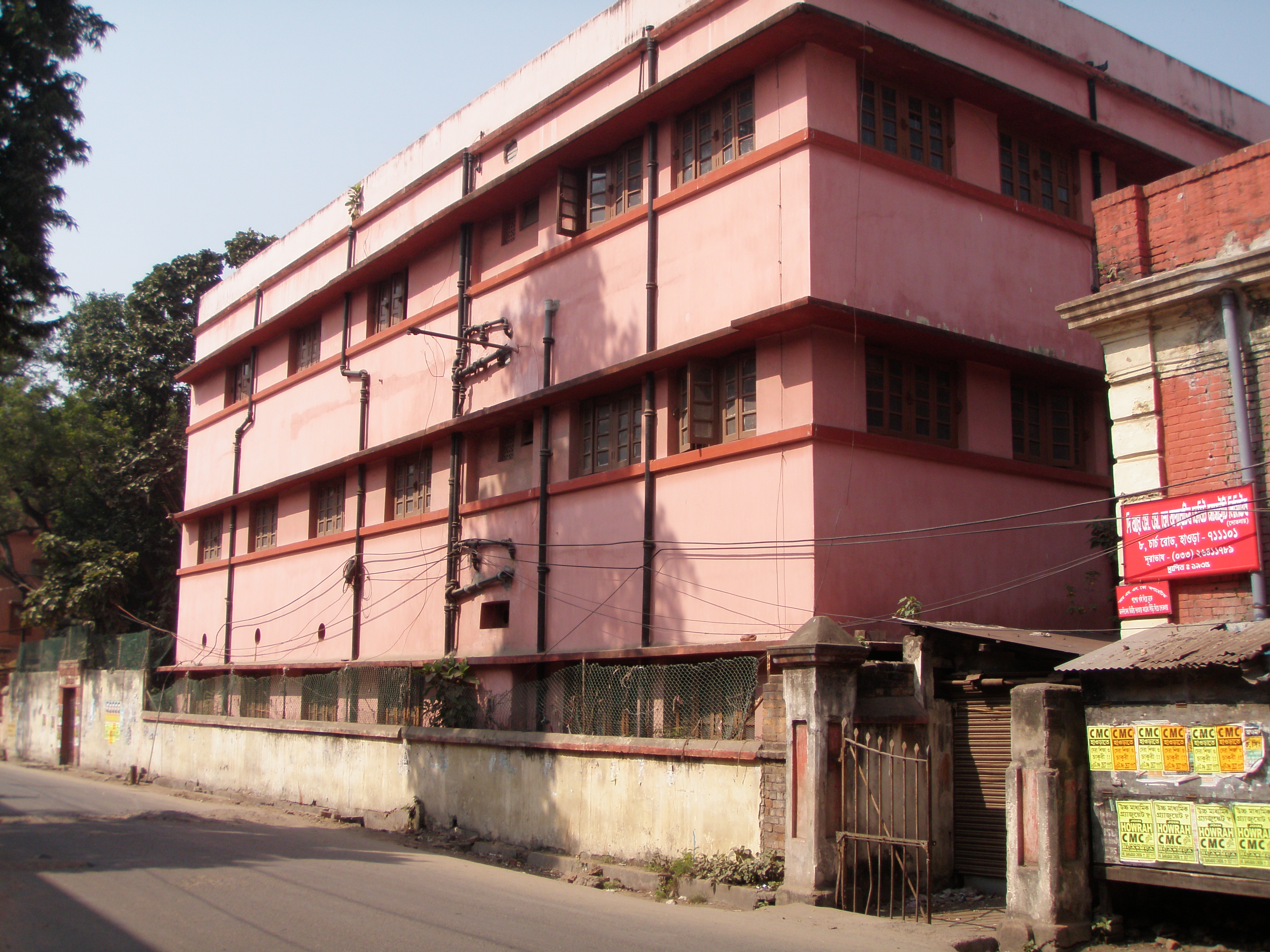
The Howrah Zilla School, now

Jadunath Babu, who was a very successful businessman and a Zamindar, built a large residence, almost resembling a palace, on the Khurut Road which is now known as Netaji Subhas Road in Howrah and arranged for Mahendranath's upbringing there.

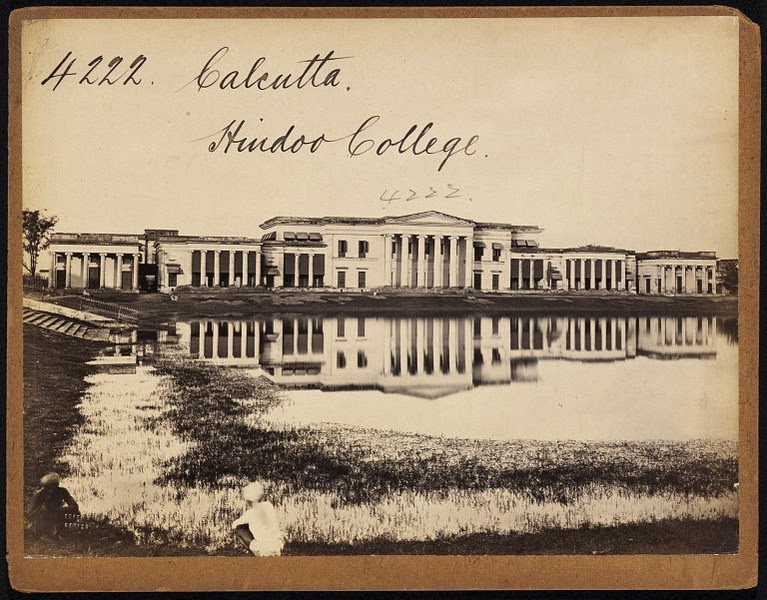
The Presidency College in Calcutta, where Mahendranath Ray studied.

Mahendranath was a bright student. He passed his Entrance Examination from Howrah Zilla School with distinction and a scholarship, enrolling at Presidency College, Calcutta. He secured the first position in the F.A. (First Arts) examination, and passed the B.A. examination in 1882, standing first in the first division, earning the prestigious Ishan Scholarship, which is awarded to the student who manages to score the highest and who ranks first in the university in every single paper particularly in Mathematics. As well as the Vizianagaram Scholarship, awarded by the Vizianagaram Estate, to the most academically successful student of B.A. of the year in the University of Calcutta. Subsequently, he received his M.A. from the University of Calcutta in 1884, also earning a first position in the First division winning the highly coveted Burdwan Scholarship, awarded by the estate of the Burdwan Raj. Furthermore, he was also selected for the famed Premchand Roychand Scholarship. He was a classmate and a very close friend of Sir Ashutosh Mukherjee. Following that he completed his B.L. from the University of Calcutta in 1885 while being a Lecturer of Mathematics at the City College, Kolkata.

== Career ==
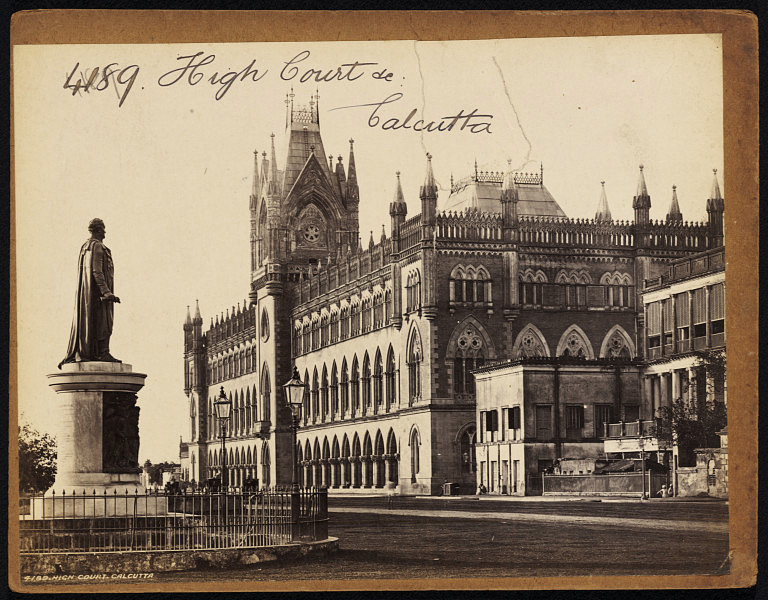
The Calcutta High Court in the 1890s

Roy established a lucrative legal practice in Howrah and Calcutta. In 1885, he joined the Calcutta High Court as a Pleader and represented many clients in many big cases in the Calcutta High court and other district courts, he earned the reputation of a hugely learned and empathetic legal practitioner, he was respected by both his colleagues and adversaries. He was known for his unmatched oratory in the courtroom. He also presented multiple cases before the Privy Council. He practiced in the Calcutta High Court for nearly forty years. From, 1895, he became a member of the The Asiatic Society at Calcutta. Later in 1900, he was elected to be a Fellow of The Asiatic Society. In 1901, he was appointed as one of the members among other members of the bar, to modernise the Calcutta High Court. In 1924, he was elected the President of the Bar association of the Calcutta High Court. In 1891, he was elected a Fellow of the University of Calcutta, being one of its first Indian fellows, and in 1909, he was elected along with only one other Indian member to be an ordinary fellow of the university. and from 1911 to 1920, he served as a member of the Bengal Legislative Council. He became one of the most prominent members of the Indian National Congress from the district of Howrah. He also, attended many provincial conferences of the party, including the one held in 1888. He was also a professor of Mathematics and Law at City College, and served as the Dean of the Faculty of Law at the University of Calcutta. He was among the official examiners of the university for the papers in Mathematics. He was also elevated to be a Magistrate for the Howrah district. In 1914, largely due to his efforts, the proposed relocation of Shibpur Engineering College from Howrah to Dhaka was successfully prevented.

== Works ==
- Improvement of street lighting in the city

After Babu Kedarnath Bhattacharya, Mahendranath Ray was the second elected Vice Chairman of the Howrah Municipal Board, from 1888 to 1896. Following that, he became the First elected chairperson of the Howrah Municipal Corporation, winning the election with a huge majority. During Ray's tenure as Chairman of the Howrah Municipality, electric lighting was installed on all paved roads. Even in unpaved roads and also in slum areas, the number of kerosene lamps was reduced and electric lighting was introduced. In 1916, the last gas lamp was removed from Howrah city.

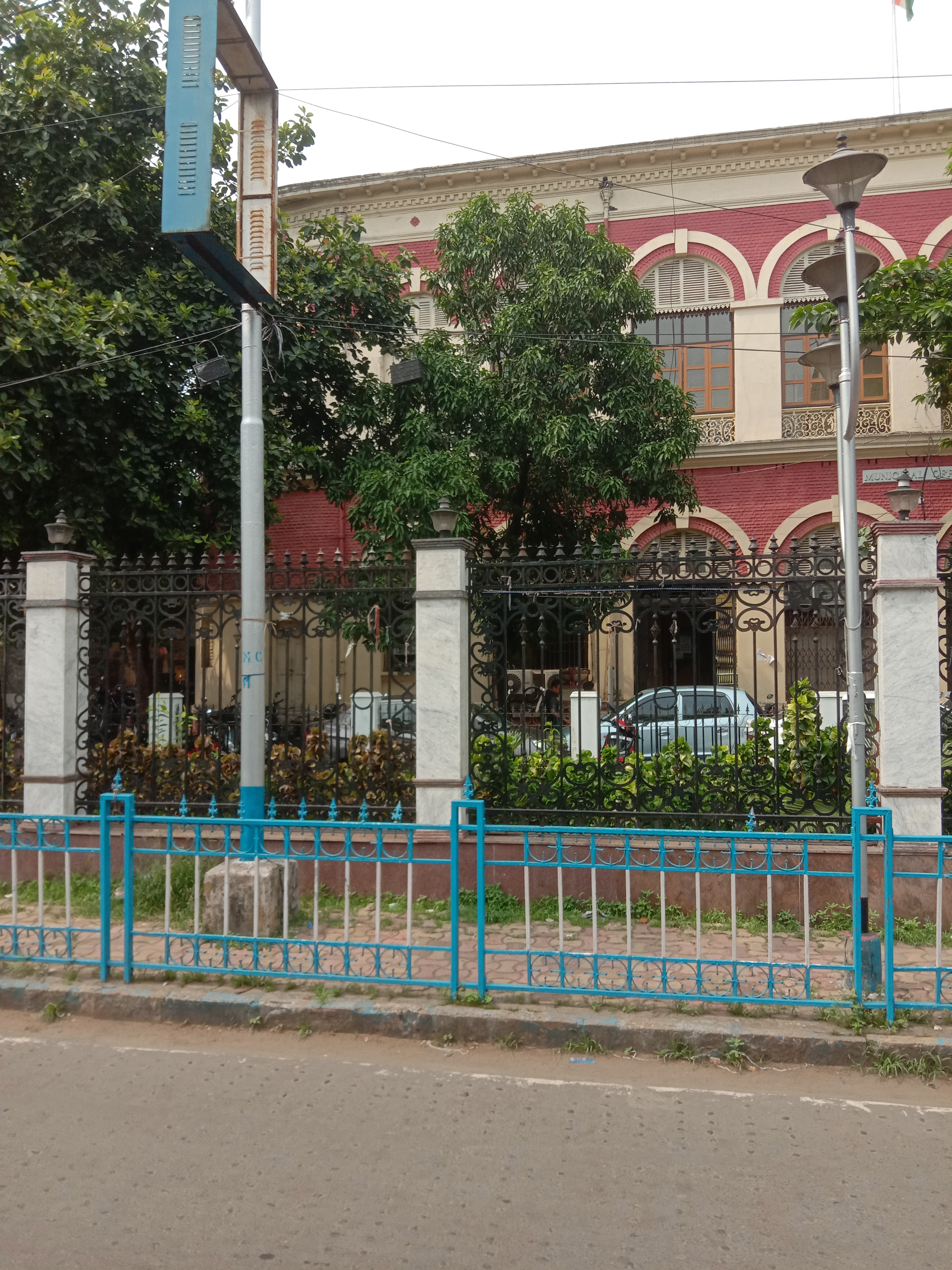
Howrah Municipal Corporation.

Under Act No.5 of 1873, the Howrah Municipality was empowered to levy an additional 3% tax to cover the expenses of gas lighting on the streets. Later, on 1 September 1932, a new agreement was signed between the Howrah Municipality and the Calcutta Electric Supply Company, which significantly reduced electricity costs. As a result, the number of electric lamp posts increased, while the number of kerosene lamps declined.

- Contributions in Academia

In 1893, he joined Dr. Mahendralal Sarkar's Indian association for the cultivation of Science and was one of its earliest faculty members, and later becoming one of its fellows. He had an aptitude for Mathematics, and he was made the head of Mathematics department there and published many journals on the subject. He published two books by the name of "Algebra Part I & II". He was made an honorary member of the Royal Mathematical society in London. He was also one of the early members of the Calcutta Mathematical Society, since its inception. He was regarded as one of the best mathematicians of the country at that time.

- As a Senator of the University of Calcutta

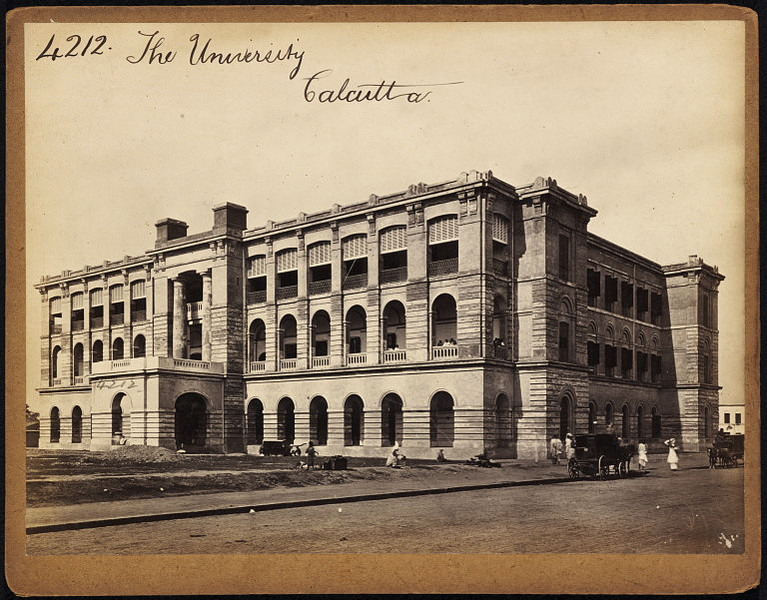
The University of Calcutta

In January 1891, Mahendranath Ray was elected as a member of the council ( Fellow) of the University of Calcutta. He was one of the first elected Fellow of the university. In 1910, he also became a member of the Syndicate of the University of Calcutta. He was instrumental in the founding of the Rajabazar Science College, Sir Ashutosh Mukherjee had personally entrusted him with the management of the massive educational project.

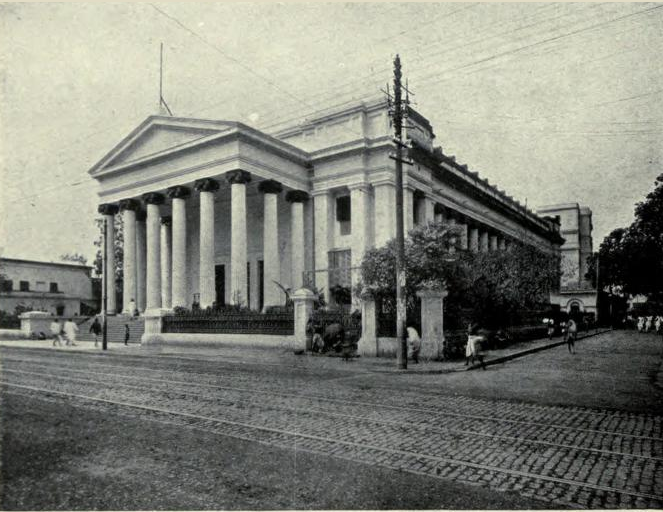
Senate Hall of University of Calcutta, early 1910s

== Styles ==
- 1861–1884: Mahendra Nath Ray
- 1884 – 1891: Babu Mahendra Nath Ray
- 21 January 1891 – June 1895: Babu Mahendra Nath Ray, HonFRS, FIAS
- June 1895 – May 1910: The Honourable Babu Mahendra Nath Ray, HonFRS, FIAS, FRASB
- May 1910 – March 1914: The Honourable Babu Mahendra Nath Ray, CIE, HonFRS, FRASB, FIAS
- March 1914 – 16 August 1925: The Honourable Babu Mahendra Nath Ray, CIE, HonFRS, FRASB, FIAS

== Personal life ==
In 1878, Mahendranath Ray married, Prabodhmayee Devi, the eldest daughter of Babu Srinibash Panja, a famous Jotedar.

== Death and legacy ==
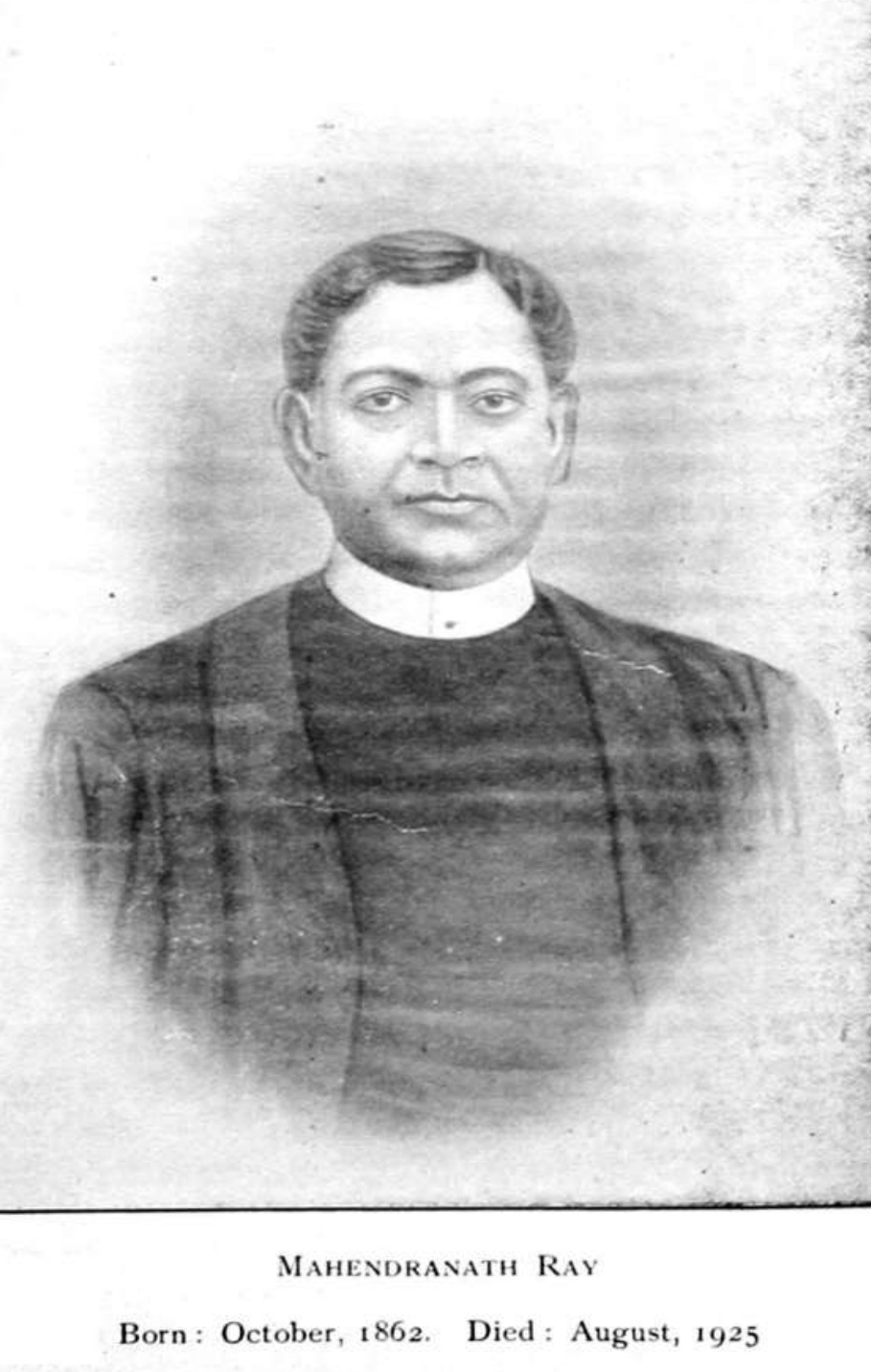
Taken from the Vol 16, Issue 3 of the Calcutta Review, published after his death as tribute to his works and contribution.

On 16 August 1925 Mahendranath Ray died at the age of 64 in his house at 2, Balaram Bose 1st Lane, Bhowanipore, Calcutta. His funeral was attended by most of the eminent personalities of the city and whole of Bengal at that time, such as Birendranath Sasmal, Sarat Chandra Bose and J M Sengupta. A huge procession was organised by the Indian National Congress.

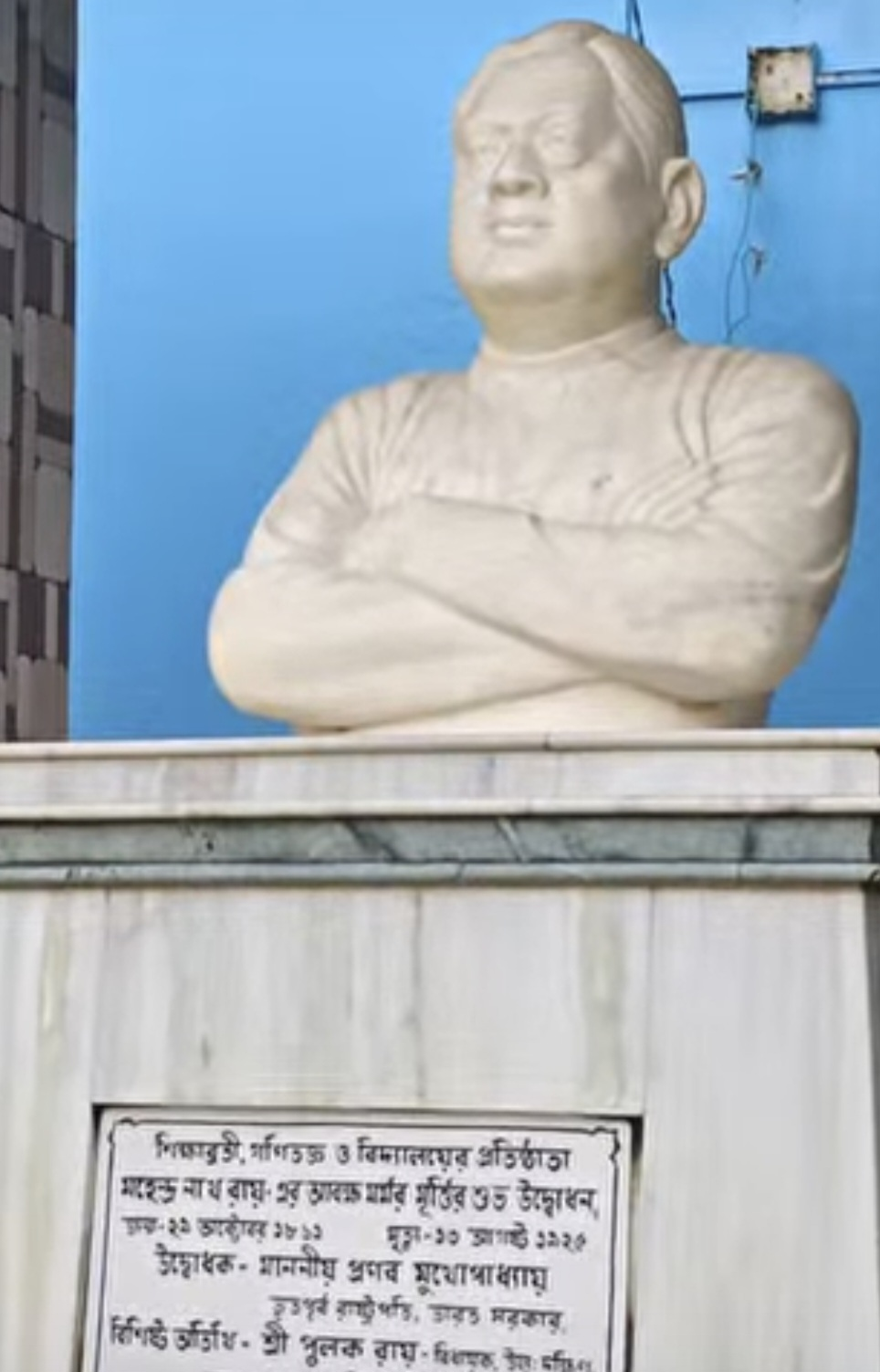
His bust at Tajpur Mahendranath Ray Institution, unveiled by Pranab Mukherjee himself. Who first started his career as a teacher in this very school.

In the city of Howrah, near Shibpur, there is a road called "Mahendra Nath Ray Ln" named after him which connects the Grand Trunk Road and the Netaji Subhash road. In the front of the building of Howrah Municipal Corporation his bust stands, a garland is placed every year, on the founding day of the corporation. Moreover, in his native village of Tajpur, near Amta, he founded a school called "Tajpur Mahendranath Ray institution" in 1895, which continues to perform well. The former President of India, Pranab Mukherjee first began his career as an assistant teacher in this very school in 1957. He visited the school back in 2017, and also inaugurated a statue of Mahendra Nath Ray, during his visit.

== Gallery ==
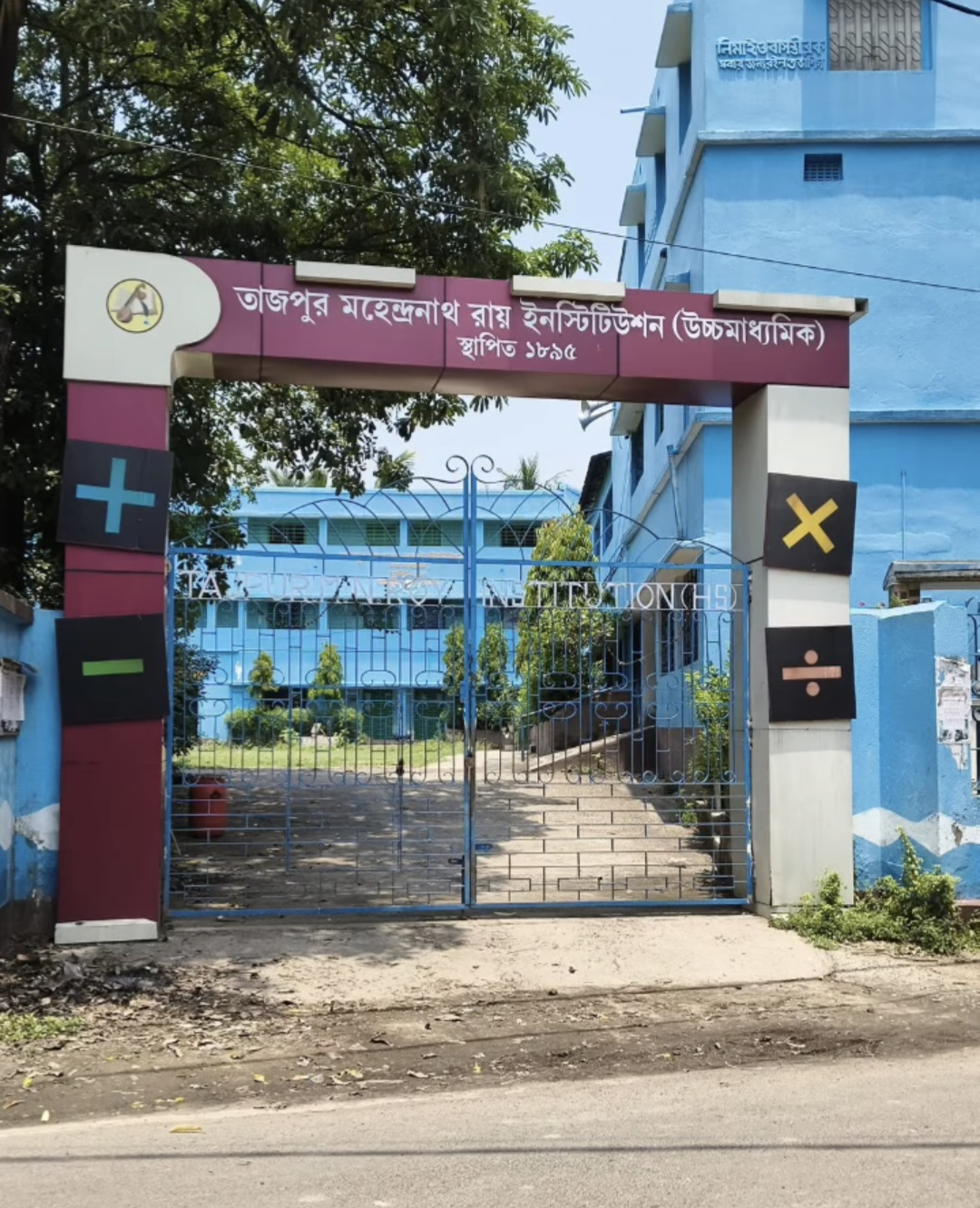
Tajpur M. N. Ray Institution, Amta, Howrah district, founded by him in 1895.
