= Santanu Chaudhuri =

- Born: Kolkata, India
- Citizenship: United States of America
- Education: SUNY Stony Brook
- Occupations: Professor of Materials and Chemical Engineering
- Organization(s): Argonne National Laboratory and University of Illinois
- Known for: Research on Molecular Dynamics, Condensed Matter Theory, Multiscale Modeling

Santanu Chaudhuri is a Professor of Engineering and the Chief Technology Officer at Thermax Limited, working on Industrial Decarbonization. In the past, he led transformative manufacturing and scale-up using AI at the Argonne National Laboratory.

== Early life and education ==
Chaudhuri was born at Howrah, India. He attended Santragachi Kedarnath Institution, Howrah and completed B.Sc in Physics, Mathematics, Industrial Chemistry from Seth Anandram Jaipuria College with Honors in Engineering Chemistry from Calcutta University. He pursued Ph.D in Computational and Materials Chemistry from State University of New York, Stony Brook. As a graduate student, he received a NATO scholarship to work at Oxford University developing simulation methods for ionic conductors, catalysts, and battery materials.

== Career ==
From 2003–2006, Chaudhuri worked at Brookhaven National Laboratory's Center for Functional Nanomaterials and developed a research program on theory-guided design of hydrogen storage materials for automobile applications. After that, he joined Washington State University and served as a Research Associate Professor in the Department of Physics and Astronomy.

In 2014, Chaudhuri moved to the University of Illinois at Urbana-Champaign and subsequently served as the Associate Director of the Applied Research Institute (ARI).He developed a research program to accelerate materials design and Manufacturing using simulation-based process design and predictions of material performance.

He is a Professor in Civil, Materials, Chemical, and Environmental Engineering Department at the University of Illinois at Chicago. He was director of Manufacturing Science and Engineering at the Argonne National Laboratory between 2017-2023. Chaudhuri is now Chief Technology Officer at Thermax Limited, a multi-billion dollar global company with presence in 14 countries. Chaudhuri is leveraging his passion for utilizing AI to scale up novel energy and climate technologies, informing a line of decarbonization products for various industries.

== Research interests ==
He has research interests on Multiscale Modeling, Condensed Matter Theory, Molecular Dynamics. Chaudhuri leads a research team that specializes in the practical and engineering application of high-performance computing in energy, environment and manufacturing.
