= Dasnagar railway station =

Railway station in West Bengal, India

Dasnagar
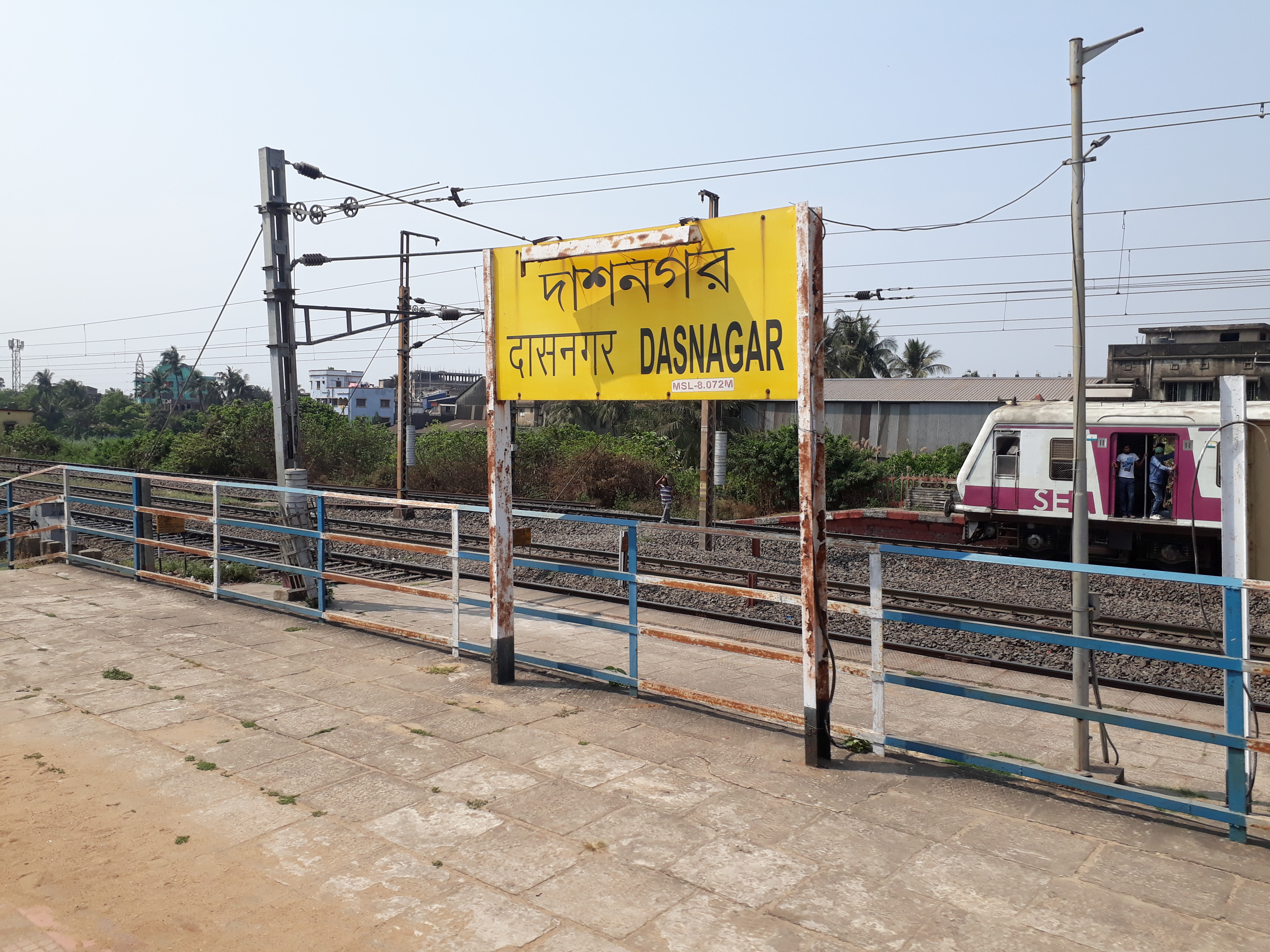

General information
- Location: Dasnagar, Howrah, West Bengal; India
- Coordinates: 22°35′53″N 88°18′28″E
- Elevation: 7 metres (23 ft)
- System: Kolkata Suburban Railway station
- Owner: Indian Railways
- Line: Howrah–Kharagpur line
- Platforms: 3

Construction
- Structure type: Elevated Railway Station
- Parking: No
- Cycle facilities: No

Other information
- Station code: DSNR
- Fare zone: South Eastern Railway

History
- Opened: 1900
- Electrified: 1967–69

Services
Preceding station	Kolkata Suburban Railway	Following station
Ramrajatala towards Midnapore	South Eastern Line Howrah–Kharagpur line	Tikiapara towards Howrah Junction
Route map
Location
- Location within Kolkata Location within West Bengal

The Dasnagar railway station in the Indian state of West Bengal, serves Dasnagar in Howrah. It is on the Howrah–Kharagpur line. It is 4 km (2 mi) from Howrah station.

== History ==
The Howrah–Kharagpur line was opened in 1900.

== Tracks ==
The Howrah–Panskura stretch has three lines.

== Electrification ==
The Howrah–Kharagpur line was electrified in 1967–69.
