= M P Cup Football Tournament (Howrah) =

M P Cup Football Tournament, Howrah
- Organising body: Howrah City Police
- Region: Howrah, India
- Number of teams: 180

M P Cup Football Tournament is a district-level football tournament at Howrah, India. It is an inter-school football tournament among the schools of whole Howrah district.

== Selection ==
There are total 18 Police Stations in howrah district. The tournament starts comprising 180 football playing schools under the 18 police station areas under the jurisdiction of the Howrah. Under each Police Station, there will be qualifying matches between the schools and 18 selected schools will play the knockout round of the tournament.

== Initiative ==
The main initiative of the tournament is taken by howrah's present MP Prasun Banerjee. The cup has been arranged by Howrah City Police at the Shibpur Police Line every year. According to MP Prasun Banerjee:

"I had the dream of organizing such tournament from earlier. I am thankful to the Howrah police division to help me organizing the tournament within three years of my tenure as the MP." (6 September 2016)
