= Hatpukur =

Village of Hooghly district, West Bengal, India

Hatpukur is a small village in Hooghly district in the state of West Bengal, India. Hatpukur is divided into five areas: Mazer Para (Musjid Tala), Paschim Para, Uttar Para (Mulla Para), Dakshin Para, and Purba Para.

There is one mosque in the center of the village in Mazer Para & Another is in under construction in Paschim Para. There is also a medical sub-centre and a primary school in Uttar Para. And there is also an Eidgah Maidana for Eid. Saddam Mullick.
