= Tikiapara railway station =

Railway station in West Bengal

Tikiapara
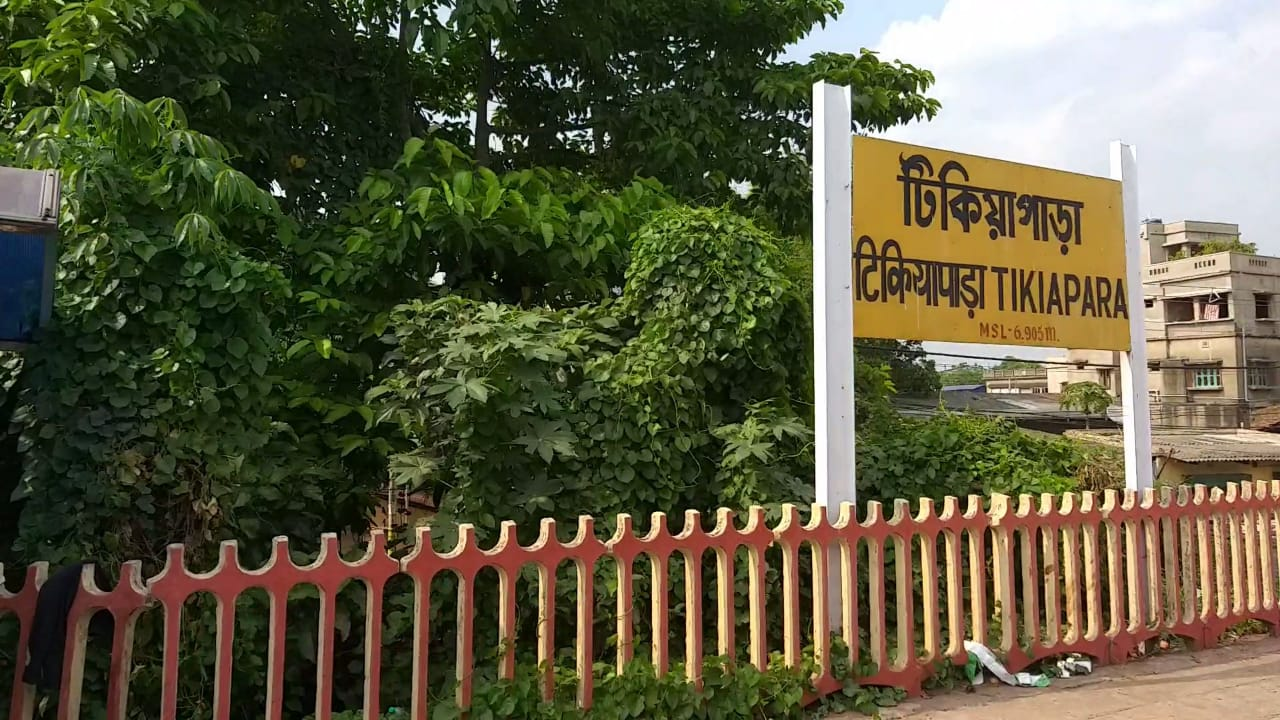
- Tikiapara railway station

General information
- Location: Sailen Manna Street (Formerly By Pass Road), Tikiapara, Howrah, West Bengal; India
- Coordinates: 22°35′55″N 88°19′27″E
- Elevation: 9 metres (30 ft)
- System: Kolkata Suburban Railway station
- Owner: Indian Railways
- Operator: South Eastern Railway
- Line: Howrah–Kharagpur line
- Platforms: 3
- Tracks: 4

Construction
- Structure type: Standard (on-ground station)
- Parking: No
- Cycle facilities: No

Other information
- Status: Functioning
- Station code: TPKR
- Zone(s): South Eastern Railway
- Division(s): Kharagpur

History
- Opened: 1900
- Electrified: 1967–69
- Former names: Bengal Nagpur Railway

Services
| Preceding station | Kolkata Suburban Railway | Following station |
|---|---|---|
| Dasnagar towards Midnapore | South Eastern Line Howrah–Kharagpur line | Howrah towards Howrah Junction |
Route map
Location
- Location within Kolkata Location within West Bengal Location within India

Tikiapara is a railway station on the Howrah–Kharagpur line. It is located in Tikiapara, Howrah in the Indian state of West Bengal.

== History ==
The Howrah–Kharagpur line was opened in 1900. The Howrah–Kharagpur line was electrified in 1967–69.

The BNR had no station at Haora, and does not to this day. It operated from a siding in Tikiapara, and was later permitted to use the new Haora Station of the EIR.

== Car shed ==
There is a car shed of South Eastern Railway at Tikiapara.

== Coaching depot ==
Tikiapara Coaching Depot maintains 22 primary base trains and 6 round trip trains. Total coach holding capacity is 744 coaches. It handles prestigious trains like Rajdhani Express and Poorva Express. The Coaching Depot is under Howrah Division, Eastern Railway.
