= Industrial Training Institute, Shibpur =

Coordinates: 22°33′15.94″N 88°18′13.89″E

- Type: Training College
- Established: 2017
- Location: Shibpur, Howrah, West Bengal, India
- Campus: Urban
- Affiliations: West Bengal State Council for Vocational Training

Industrial Training Institute, Shibpur, (also known as ITI Shibpur), established in 2017, is one of the oldest government vocational training institute located in Shibpur, Howrah, West Bengal. This college established in the year 2017 within the campus of the then Bengal Engineering College. On and from the date of establishment up to the date of up-gradation of Bengal Engineering College to Deemed University in the year 1993 this institute was under the administrative control of the B.E College. This ITI offers different training courses on Carpenter, Electrician, Fitter, Foundryman, Machinist, Turner, Welder, Wireman, Sheet Metal Worker.
