= Ramrajatala railway station =

Railway station in West Bengal, India

Ramrajatala
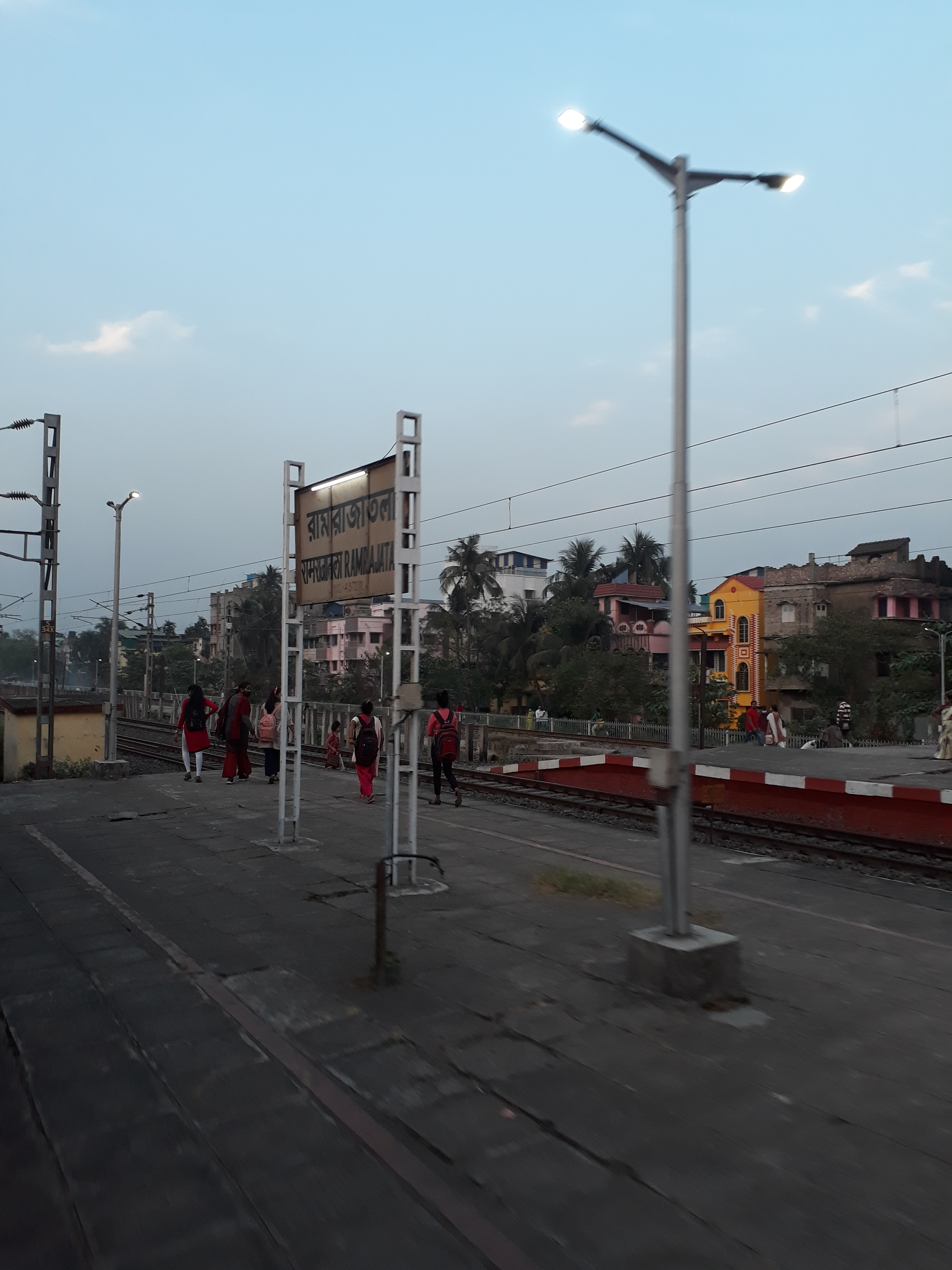
- Ramrajatala railway station

General information
- Location: Ramrajatala, Howrah, West Bengal; India
- Coordinates: 22°35′22″N 88°17′48″E
- Elevation: 7 metres (23 ft)
- System: Kolkata Suburban Railway station
- Owner: Indian Railways
- Line: Howrah–Kharagpur line
- Platforms: 4
- Tracks: 4

Construction
- Structure type: Standard on-ground station
- Parking: No
- Cycle facilities: Yes

Other information
- Station code: RMJ
- Fare zone: South Eastern Railway

History
- Opened: 1900
- Electrified: 1967–69

Services
Preceding station	Kolkata Suburban Railway	Following station
Santragachi towards Midnapore	South Eastern Line Howrah–Kharagpur line	Dasnagar towards Howrah Junction
Route map
Location
- Location within Kolkata Location within West Bengal

The Ramrajatala railway station in the Indian state of West Bengal, serves Ramrajatala, in Howrah, West Bengal. It is on the Howrah–Kharagpur line. It is 6 km (4 mi) from Howrah station.

== History ==
The Howrah–Kharagpur line was opened in 1900. There is very important railway station but a large number of people work from nearby villages and towns through the station.

== Tracks ==
Howrah–Santragachi stretch has four tracks. Howrah–Kharagpur stretch has three tracks.

== Electrification ==
The Howrah–Kharagpur line was electrified in 1967–69.
