= Industrial Training Institute, Howrah Homes =

Indian vocational training institute

Coordinates: 22°35′01.01″N 88°17′37.70″E

- Type: Training College
- Location: Santragachi, Howrah, West Bengal, India
- Campus: Urban
- Affiliations: West Bengal State Council for Vocational Training

Industrial Training Institute, Howrah Homes, (also known as ITI Howrah Homes), is a government vocational training institute located in Santragachi, Howrah district, West Bengal. The institute offers training courses for carpenters, civil draughtsmen, mechanical draughtsmen, surveyors, A/C and refrigeration mechanics, motor vehicle mechanics, electricians, fitters, foundrymen, machinists, turners, welders, wiremen, and sheet metal workers.
