= Howrah Zilla School =

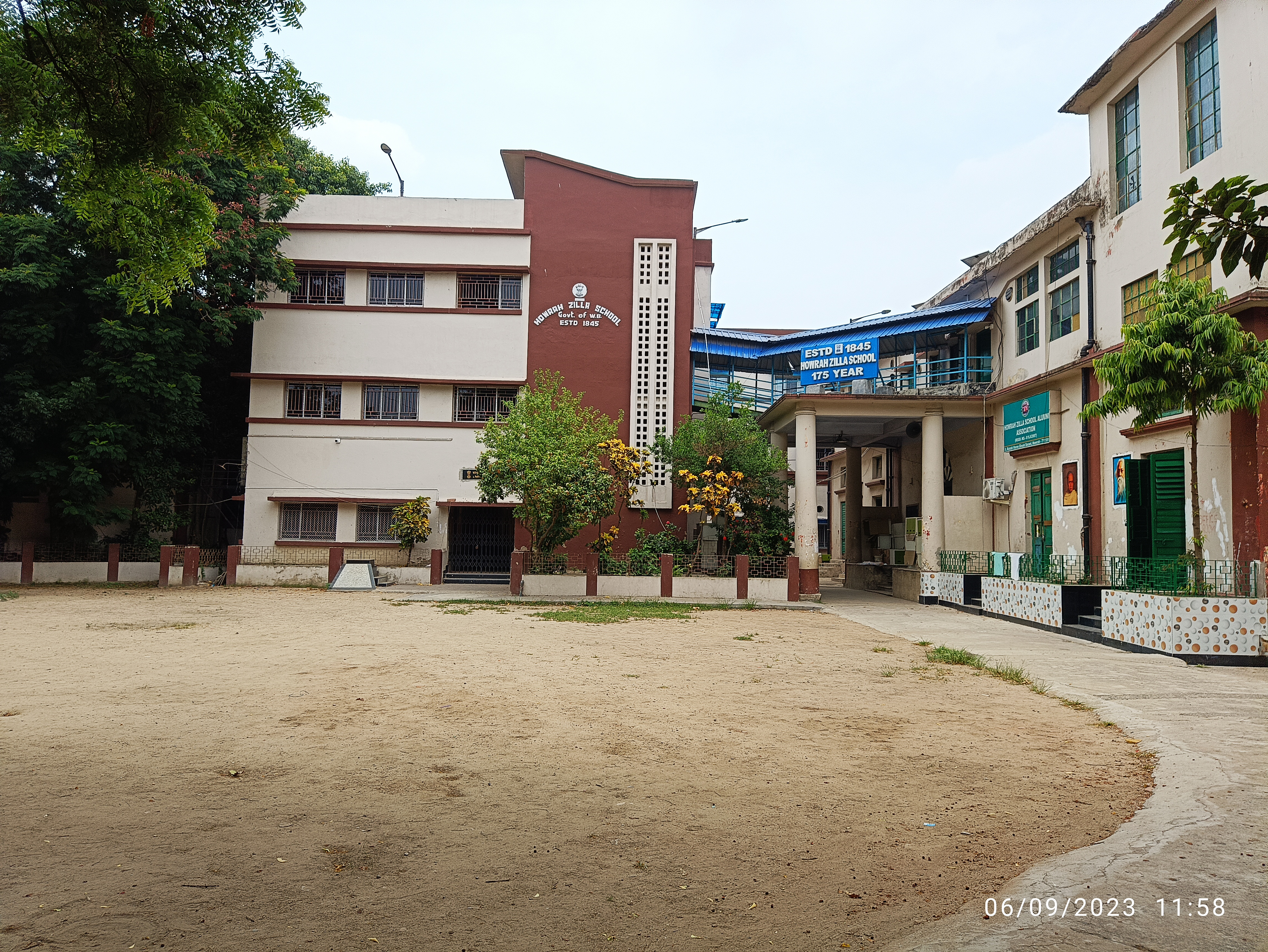
- Howrah Zilla School in 2023

Location
- 9 Church Road (also Biplabi Haren Ghosh Sarani), Howrah-711101; Howrah, West Bengal; India

Information
- Former name: Howrah Government School
- School type: Government High School
- Established: 1 December 1845
- Founder: East India Company
- School code: 19161502906
- Headmaster: Dhananjay Sarkar (assistant headmaster-in-charge)
- Faculty: 50
- Grades: Preprimary-XII
- Enrollment: c. 1200 (secondary and high secondary) and 600 (primary)
- Student to teacher ratio: 40:1
- Language: Bengali
- Schedule: Sec, HS- 11.00am- 4.30pm; Primary- 7.30am-10.30am
- Classrooms: 22
- Song: Jana Gana Mana Bande Mataram
- Yearbook: Diganta (দিগন্ত) and a wall magazine named Ankur (অঙ্কুর)
- Affiliation: West Bengal Board of Secondary Education and West Bengal Council of Higher Secondary Education
- Website: howrahzillaschool.webs.com

Howrah Zilla School, abbreviated as HZS, is a Governmental, Bengali medium, higher secondary school located in Howrah in the state of West Bengal, India. It is the only government high school of Howrah. It is affiliated with West Bengal Board of Secondary Education and West Bengal Council of Higher Secondary Education.

== History ==
The school was established on 1 December 1845. The plan for the school was approved by the District Magistrate, Cockburn Sahib. British teacher, Mr. Donalgard was appointed as the first headmaster. During that period, educationist Bhagabati Charan Basu served as one of its teachers. At that time, it was known as Howrah Government School. Bhudev Mukhopadhyay, a disciple of Henry Louis Vivian Derozio and classmate of Michael Madhusudan Dutt, was the first Indian headmaster of the school. Classes were initially held in a rented house near Howrah Court, in exchange for Rs. 60. Later, when the number of students increased, the British Government provided new land and money for setting up a new building for the students. In 1885, students of this school first appeared in the entrance examination of University of Calcutta. Makhanlal Dey, who ranked first in this exam in 1899, was appointed as the Headmaster of this institution in 1938. Other notable faculty include Umes Chandra Das, Korunanidhan Bandopadhyay, Bidhubhusan Bhattacharya, Jogen Chowdhury, Jaydeep Sarangi and Sagar Sen. Now it is the only Governmental school of Howrah district.

== Campus ==
Howrah Zilla School has six buildings in total. Two of them have been declared as heritage buildings. The school has two different teachers' rooms for morning and day section. The school has two conference halls named as "New Hall" and "Old Hall".

=== Laboratories ===
The school has five subject-based laboratories.

- Chemistry Laboratory
- Physics Laboratory
- Computer Laboratory
- Biology Laboratory
- Geography Laboratory
- Statistics Laboratory

== Notable alumni ==
- Soumitra Chatterjee, film and stage actor and poet
- Subroto Mukherjee, first Air Marshal of the Indian Air Force
- Mahendranath Roy, CIE, lawyer and politician, first elected chairman of the Howrah Municipal Corporation
- Mani Shankar Mukherjee, Bengali writer, known for his book on Swami Vivekananda
- Muhammad Shahidullah, educationist, linguist
- Bani Kumar, the writer of the Mahisasuramardini script which is played on the auspicious Mornings of Mahalaya in the voice of Birendra Krishna Bhadra

== Notable Faculty ==
- Jogen Chowdhury

== Alumni Association ==
Alumni association of the school was established in the year 2010. The association mainly celebrates the foundation day of the institution. It also arranges an annual medical camp for students.
