= Domjur =

- Census Town
- Amta Road and Jagadishpur Road Junction, Domjur

- Location in West Bengal, India Domjur (India)
- Coordinates: 22.64°N 88.22°E
- Country: India
- State: West Bengal
- District: Howrah
- Elevation: 11 m (36 ft)

Population (2011)
  - Total: 18,433

Languages
  - Official: Bengali, English
- Time zone: UTC+5:30 (IST)
- Vehicle registration: WB
- Lok Sabha constituency: Sreerampur
- Vidhan Sabha constituency: Domjur
- Website: howrah.gov.in

Domjur is a census town in Domjur CD Block of Howrah Sadar subdivision in Howrah district in the Indian state of West Bengal.

== Geography ==
Domjur is located at 22.64°N 88.22°E. It has an average elevation of 11 metres (36 feet).

== Demographics ==
As per 2011 Census of India, Domjur had a total population of 18,433, of which 9,040 (49%) were males and 9,393 (51%) were females. Population below 6 years was 1,725. The total number of literates in Domjur was 8,990 (48.77% of the population over 18 years).

Domjur was part of Kolkata Urban Agglomeration in 2011 census.

As of 2001 India census, Domjur had a population of 16,822. Males constitute 50% of the population and females 50%. Domjur has an average literacy rate of 49%, lower than the national average of 59.5%; male literacy is 43% and female literacy is 56%. In Domjur, 10% of the population is under 6 years of age.

Sastitala is the biggest area of Domjur. Hindus form about 73% of the total population while Muslims make up for nearly 27%. Christians, Jains and non-religious people constitute a minuscule part of the population.

=== Culture and festivals ===
Durga Puja

Kali Puja

Similar to the rest of Bengal, Durga Puja, Eid al-Fitr and Kali Puja are the three major festivals celebrated here. Dolyatra (Holi), Jagaddhatri Puja, Rath Yatra, Saraswati Puja, Manasa Puja and Christmas are also celebrated in the town. Baruipara Raksha Kali Puja, Bagpara Kali Puja, Domjur BDO Kali Puja, Pancham Dol at Makarchandi Temple are other major festivals of Domjur.

== Transport ==
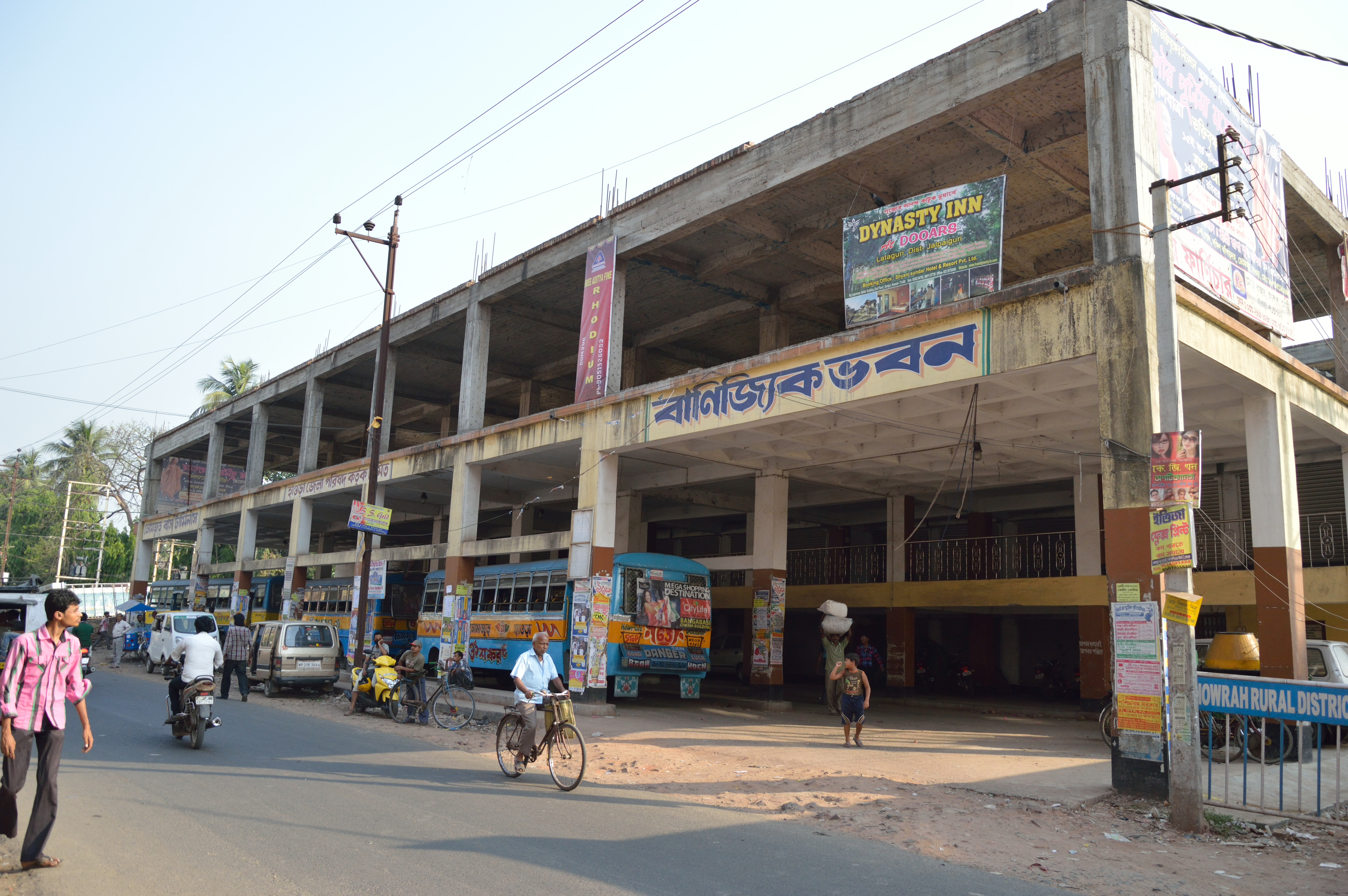
Domjur Bus Stand

=== Bus ===
Domjur is the junction of Amta Road (part of State Highway 15) and Domjur-Jagadishpur Road.

==== Private bus ====
- 63 Domjur - Howrah Station
- E44 Rampur - Howrah Station
- K11 Domjur - Rabindra Sadan

==== Mini bus ====
- Domjur-khidirpur

==== CTC bus ====
- C11 Domjur - B.B.D. Bagh/Belgachia
- C11/1 Munsirhat - Howrah Station

==== Bus routes without numbers ====
- Bargachia - Sealdah Station (Barafkal)
- Pancharul - Howrah Station
- Udaynarayanpur - Howrah Station
- Rajbalhat - Howrah Station
- Tarakeswar - Howrah Station

=== Train ===
Domjur Road railway station and Domjur railway station on Howrah-Amta line are 25.29 kilometres (15.71 mi) and 26.23 kilometres (16.30 mi) respectively from Howrah Station. Domjur is part of the Kolkata Suburban Railway railway system.

Other Services

Gio Auto Domjur - Munsirhat

Domjur- Jagatballavpur(Maitapukur)

3 Wheeler Auto Domjur - Dhulagori

== Health service ==
Domjur has its own hospital. Apart from that, there are many nursing homes and polyclinics in the area.

== Bank and Insurance ==
In Domjur town there are several public sector as well as private sector banks such as SBI, Indian Bank, UCO Bank, Punjab National Bank, Bank of Baroda, Canara Bank, ICICI, HDFC Bank, IndusInd Bank, Axis Bank, Bandhan Bank and Ujjivan Small Finance Bank etc. Life Insurance Corporation of India also has branch in Domjur town.

== Gallery ==
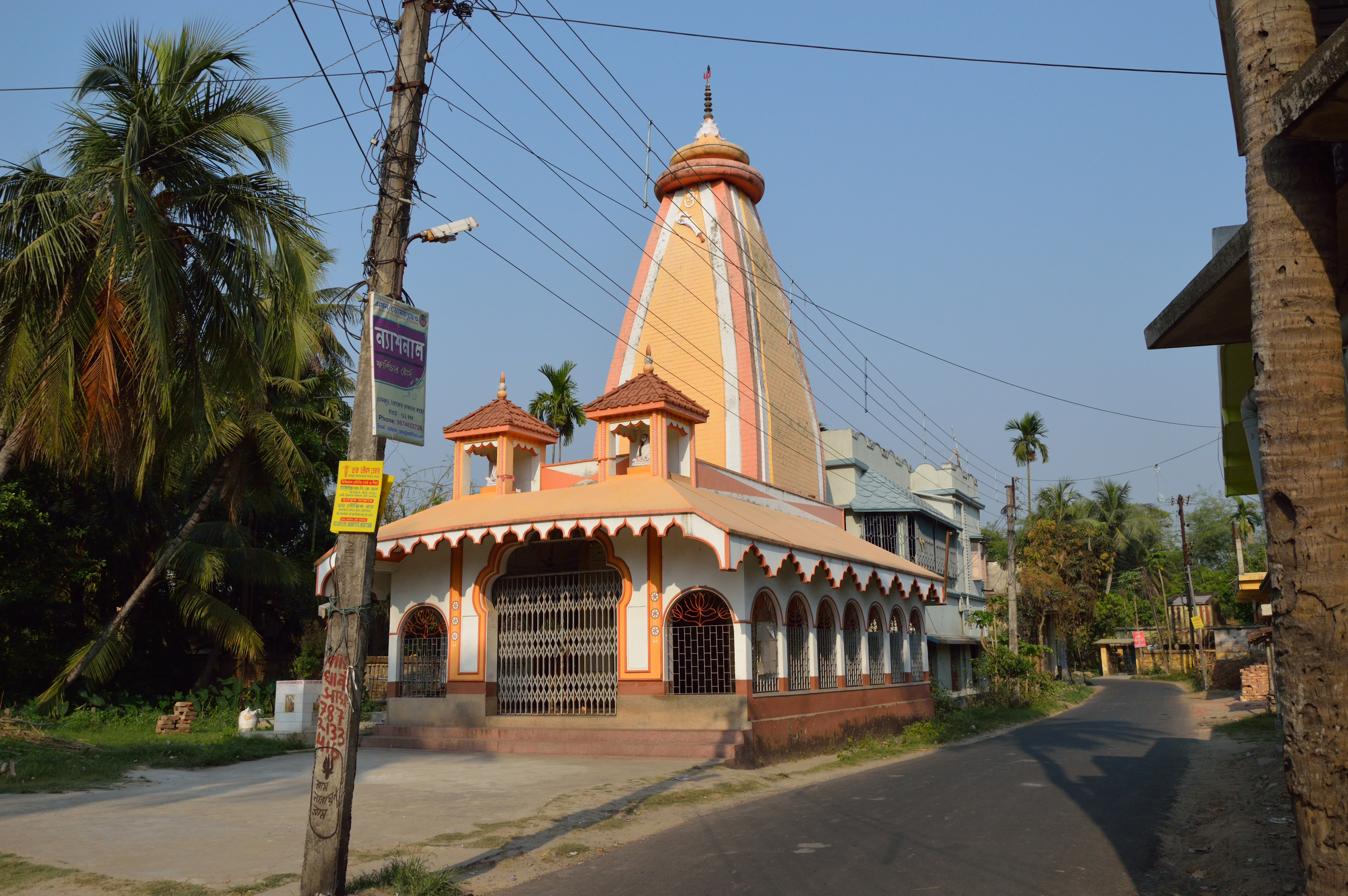
Kali Mandir, Parbatipur, Domjur

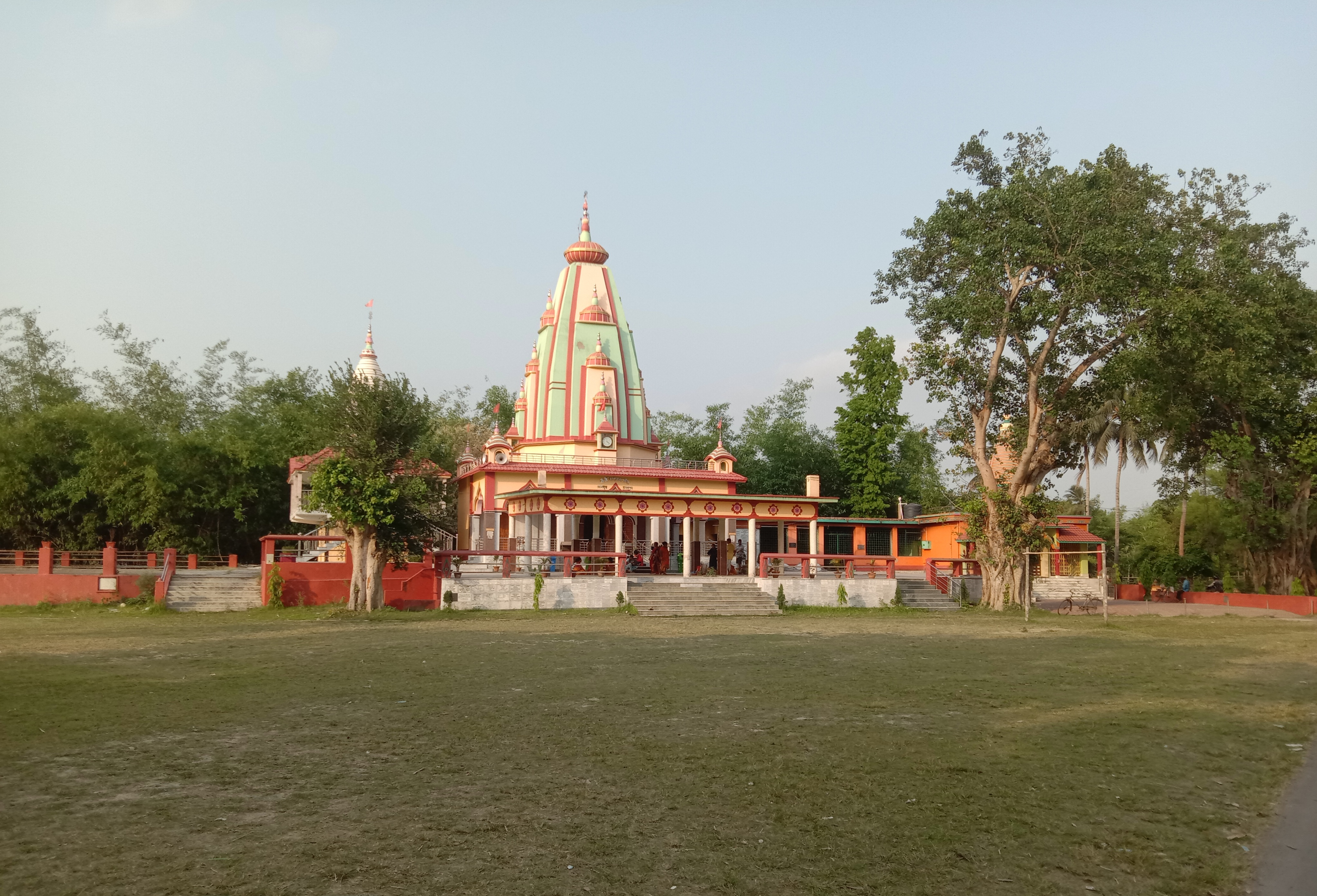
Kali Mandir in Choto Sastitala, Domjur

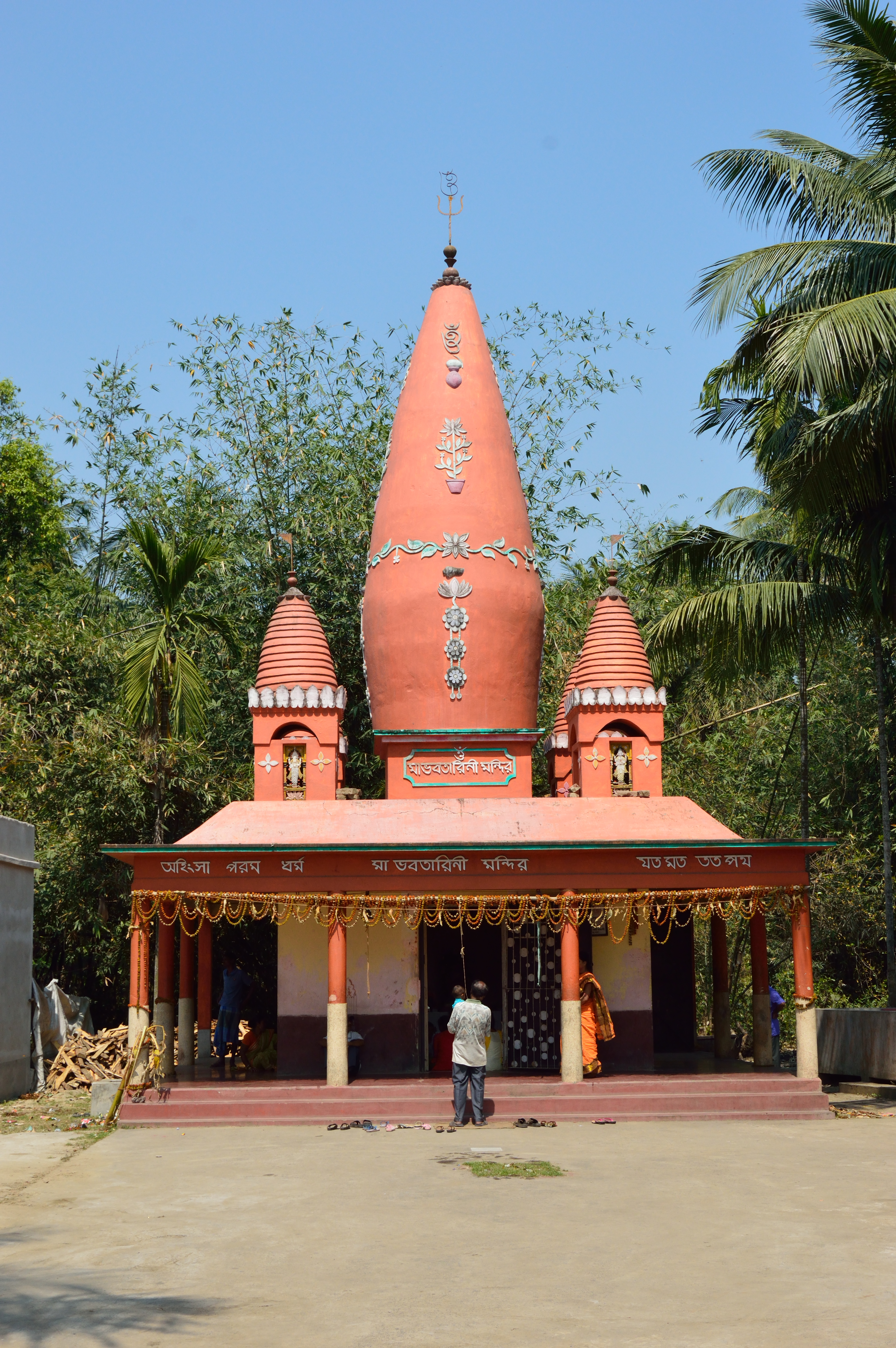
Bhabatarini Mandir, Narna, Domjur

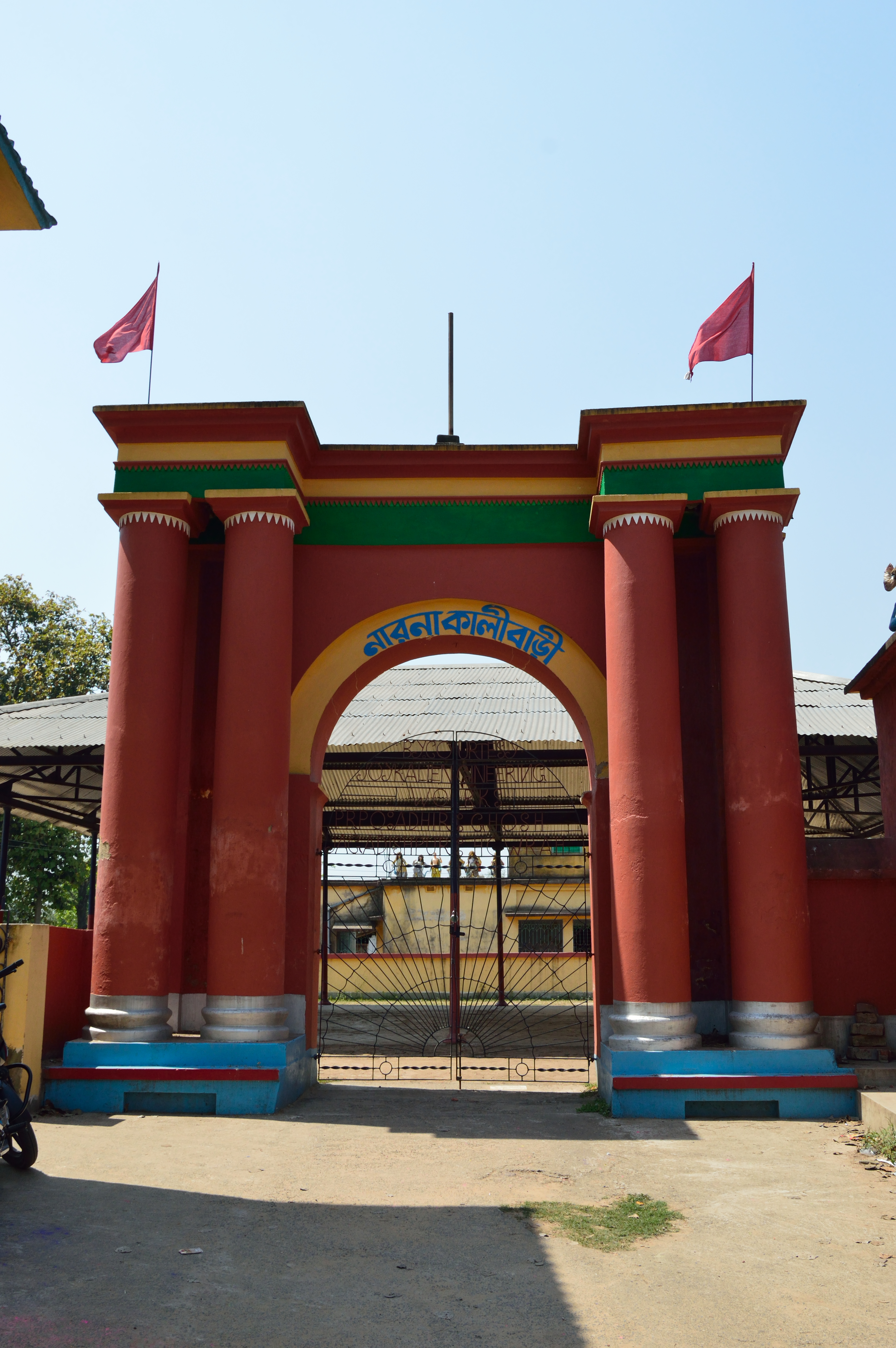
Gateway of Kalibari, Narna, Domjur

Southern Facade of Kalibari, Narna, Domjur

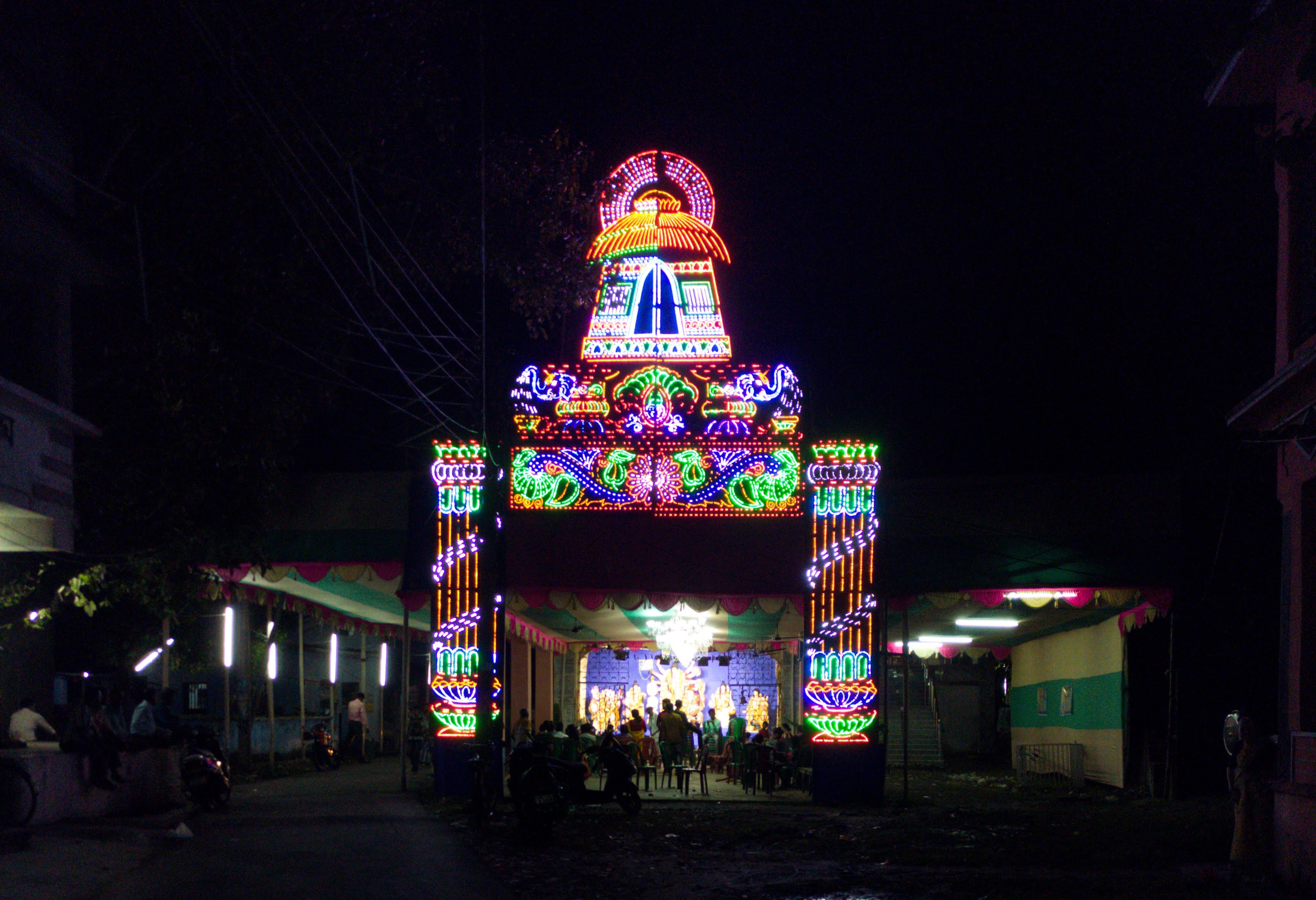
sastitala durga mandap, Sastitala, Domjur
