= Trams in Kolkata =

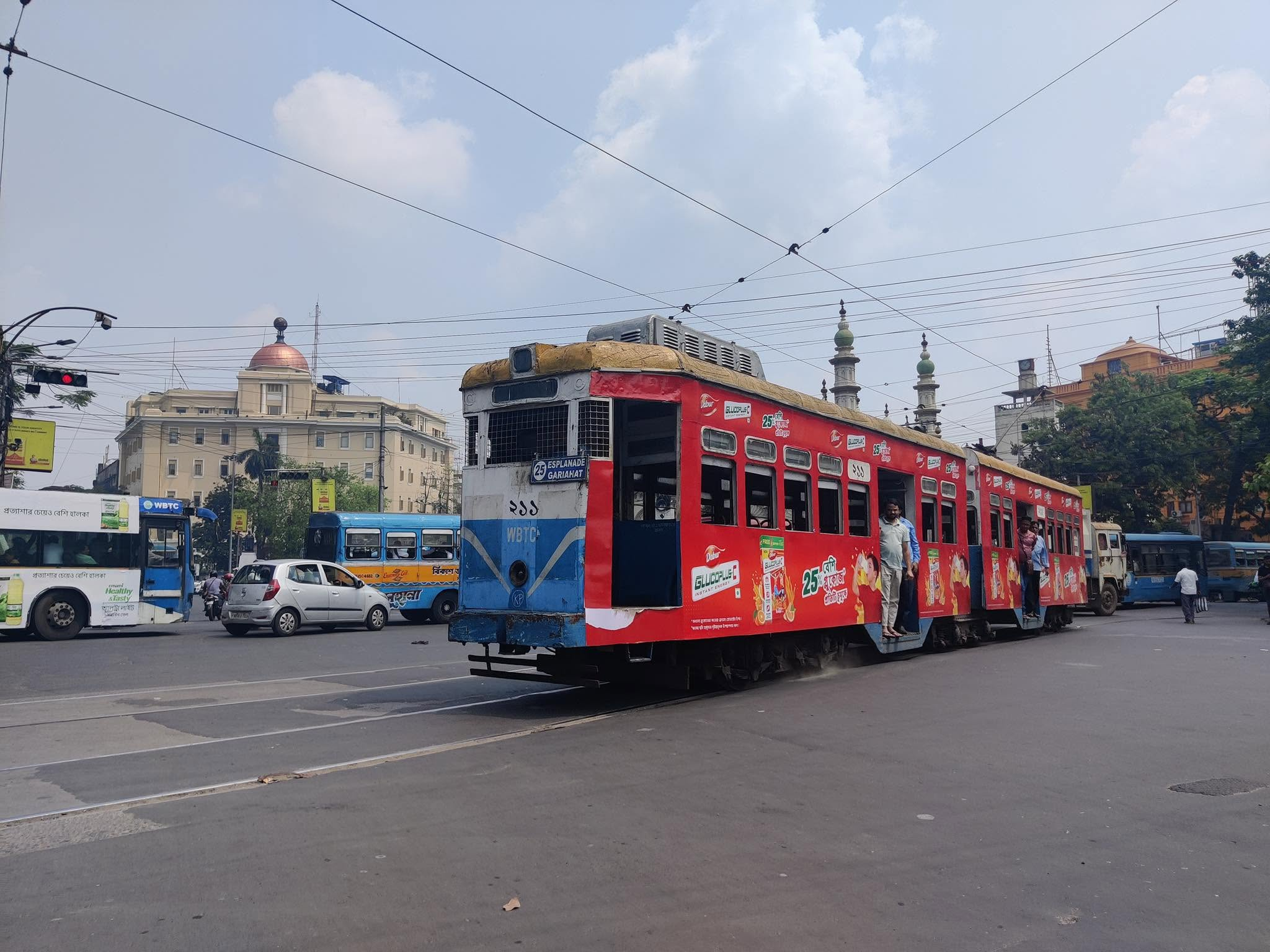
- A Tramcar entering the Esplanade Tram Terminus in 2024.

Overview
- Owner: Government of West Bengal
- Area served: Kolkata downtown
- Locale: Kolkata, India
- Transit type: Tramways
- Number of lines: 2
- Daily ridership: 15,000 daily
- Annual ridership: 5.4 lacs. (approx.)
- Headquarters: 12, R. N. Mukherjee Road, Kolkata – 700001
- Website: Calcutta Tramways

Operation
- Began operation: 24 February 1873; 153 years ago
- Operator: WBTC
- Number of vehicles: 7
- Headway: 30 Minutes

Technical
- System length: 14 km
- No. of tracks: 2
- Track gauge: Standard gauge 1,435 mm (4 ft 8 1/2 in)
- Electrification: 550 V DC Overhead line, Trolleypole

The Kolkata Tramways is a historic tramway system serving Kolkata, the capital city of the Indian state of West Bengal. Besides being an integral component of the city's public transport network, it is widely regarded as one of Kolkata's most recognisable and a defining symbol of the city's cultural and historical identity. The tram network is operated by West Bengal Transport Corporation (WBTC) after Calcutta Tramways Company (CTC) was merged with WBTC. Since its inception in 1873, the Kolkata Tramways has stood as one of the world's oldest continuously operating tram networks, and Asia's first and oldest running Tramways. Being electrified in 1902, Calcutta became the second Asian city with an electric tramway, right after Madras Tramways. The Kolkata Tramway is the only tramway currently operating in India. With the help of periodic negligence, the Government of West Bengal (current operators) had formed systematic initiatives to suspend the entire tram network from the city and sell properties. However, an apolitical organization named Calcutta Tram Users Association (CTUA), a public body formed in 2016, advocates continuously in favour of the Tramways of Kolkata. The network initially had up to 37 lines in the 1960s, but has gradually reduced over the years with only two routes currently operating due to financial struggles, poor maintenance, low ridership, addition of road flyovers, expansion of the Kolkata Metro, slow tram speed due to unnecessary blockage of Tram tracks by other vehicles, and perceptions that the trams are outdated and occupy too much road space. Currently two tram routes are operating, Route 5 (Shyambazar – Esplanade) and Route 25 (Gariahat – Esplanade). Following the change of state government in May 2026, the new administration decided to revive Kolkata's historic tramways with modern imported tramcars, just two years after the previous government moved to shut down the service.

== History ==
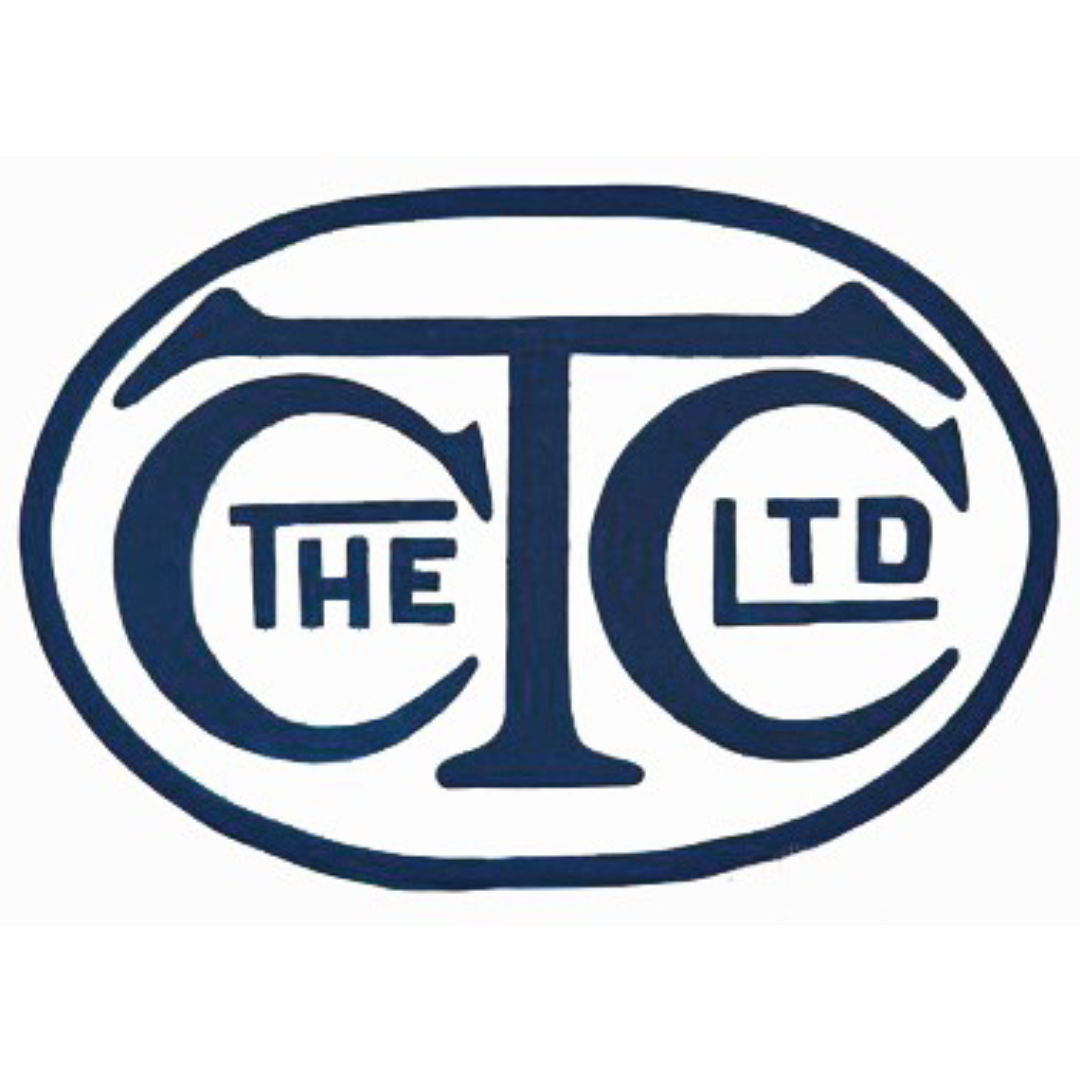
The Calcutta Tramways Company was incorporated in London on 1880

=== 1873–1901: Horse-drawn trams ===
The first horse-drawn trams in India ran for 2.4 miles (3.9 km) between Sealdah and Armenian Ghat Street on 24 February 1873. The service was discontinued on 20 November of that year. The Calcutta Tramway Company was formed and registered in London on 22 December 1880. Meter-gauge horse-drawn tram tracks were laid from Sealdah to Armenian Ghat via Bowbazar Street, Dalhousie Square, and Strand Road. The route was inaugurated by the Viceroy, Lord Ripon, on 1 November 1880.

A Kalighat bound Horse drawn Tram car at Old Court House Street

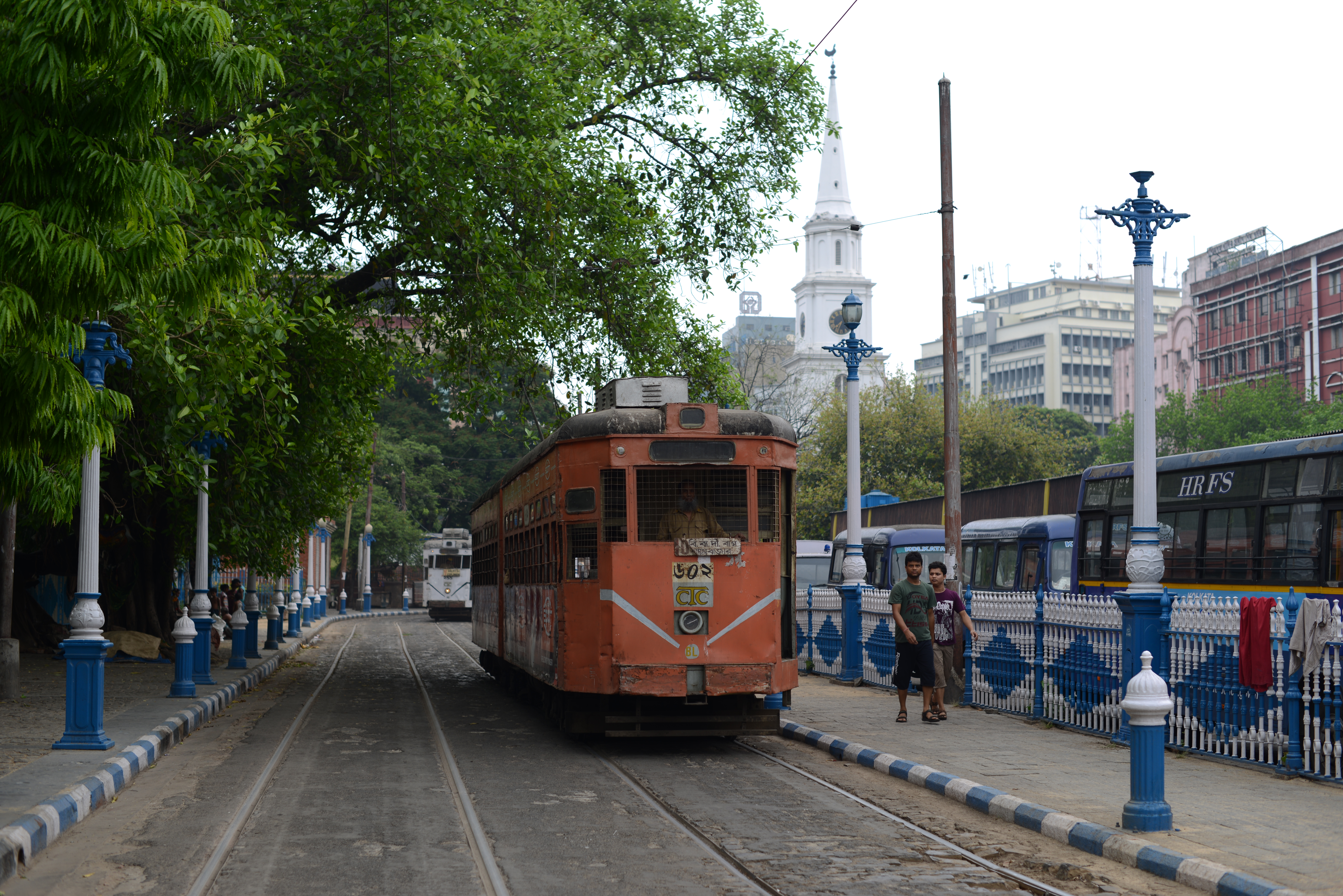
BBD Bag Tram Terminus is the oldest tram terminus of Kolkata, now suspended for construction of Green Line Metro

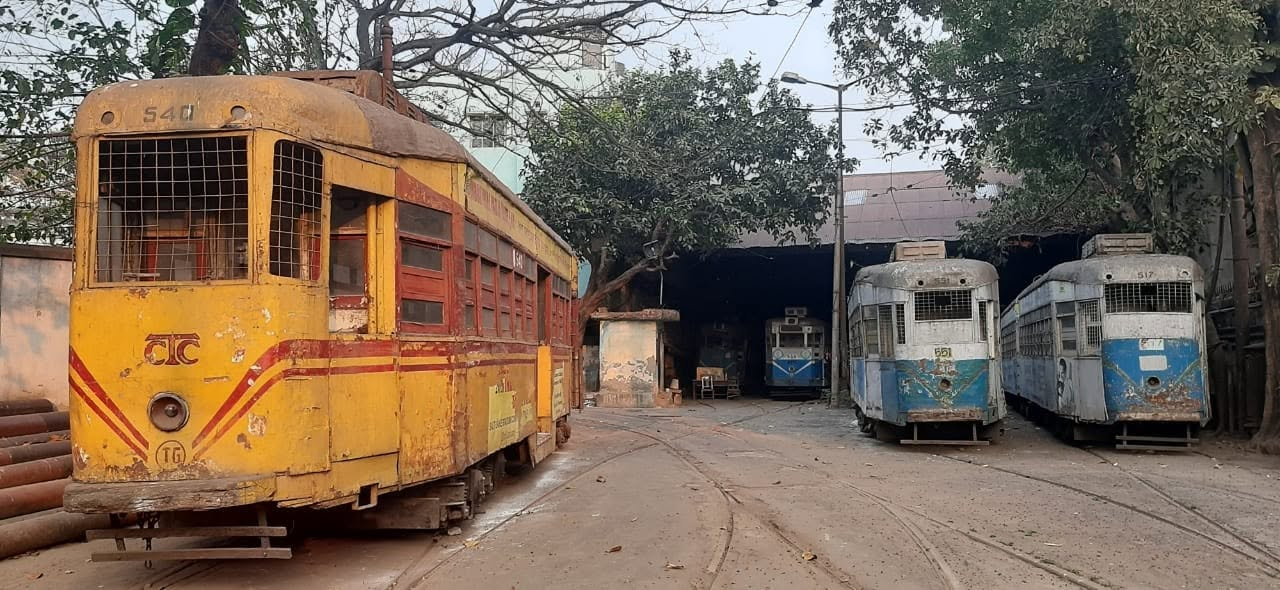
Kalighat Tram Depot is the smallest (in terms of both area and track number) and oldest tram depot in Kolkata

At first, it was planned to open tram network in three directions – in the north, east and south. In the north, towards Kumortuli via Chitpore Road (now Rabindra Sarani) for easy transportation of then-rich Indians, middle-classes and poor who lived in those areas. In the east, towards Sealdah stations via Bowbazar Street (now Bipin Bihari Ganguly Street) for railway passengers' interchange who come from outside of Kolkata. In the south, towards Kalighat via Russa Road (now Ashutosh Mukhopadhyay Road) for a Hindu pilgrimage towards the Kali temple for inhabitants and tourists. Kalighat tram depot was also constructed at that, time, which was also a minor workshop for all horse trams. Besides this the city center connection between Dharmatala (now known as Esplanade) & Dalhousie Square (now known as Binay Badal Dinesh Bag) was also established via Old Court House Street (now Hemanta Basu Sarani). One year later, a second route towards north Kolkata up to Shyambazar via College Street was opened for residents and students of medical college, university, and various schools & colleges. A second route from Wellington Square (now known as Subodh Chandra Mullick Square) to Sealdah Station via Moula Ali was also opened for more transportation of railway passengers. Sealdah tram terminus was at that place where Sealdah metro station of the Kolkata metro line 2 is. At the same time, the first opening a westward tram route was opened by the High Court via Strand Road (now Rajib Gandhi Sarani) was connected by tram network for pleaders, law-related peoples, and river-bathers of Ganga. High Court tram terminus was at that place where now the annexure building of the High Court is situated. Another connection from Metcalf Hall towards Nimtala via Strand Road was also opened for serving the crematorium and serving of businessmen. Nimtala tram terminus was at that place beside of the red temple building is now situated. By opening those routes, Shyambazar, High Court, Nimtala, Sealdah, Dalhousie Square, Esplanade and Kalighat area was connected by horse tram. Kalighat was the only depot at that time, so it was the oldest tram depot.

==== Timeline ====
- 1873 – Opening of horse tram as meter gauge, closure in the same year.
- 1880 – Final opening of horse tram as a permanent system. Calcutta Tramways Company was established.
- 1881 – Dalhousie Square – Lalbazar – Bowbazar – Lebutala - Sealdah Station route opened (Later route 14). Esplanade – Lalbazar – Chitpore – Company Bagan – Shobhabazar – Kumortuli route opened (Later route 7 after extension). Dalhousie Square – Esplanade connection opened (Later route 22, 24, 25 & 29). The connection was improved at Lalbazar Junction for through running trams from Dalhousie Square to Kumortuli (Later route 8 after extension). Esplanade – Planetarium - Hazra Park – Kalighat route opened (Later route 30). Occasional through service started from Kumortuli to Kalighat either via Esplanade or via Dalhousie Square.
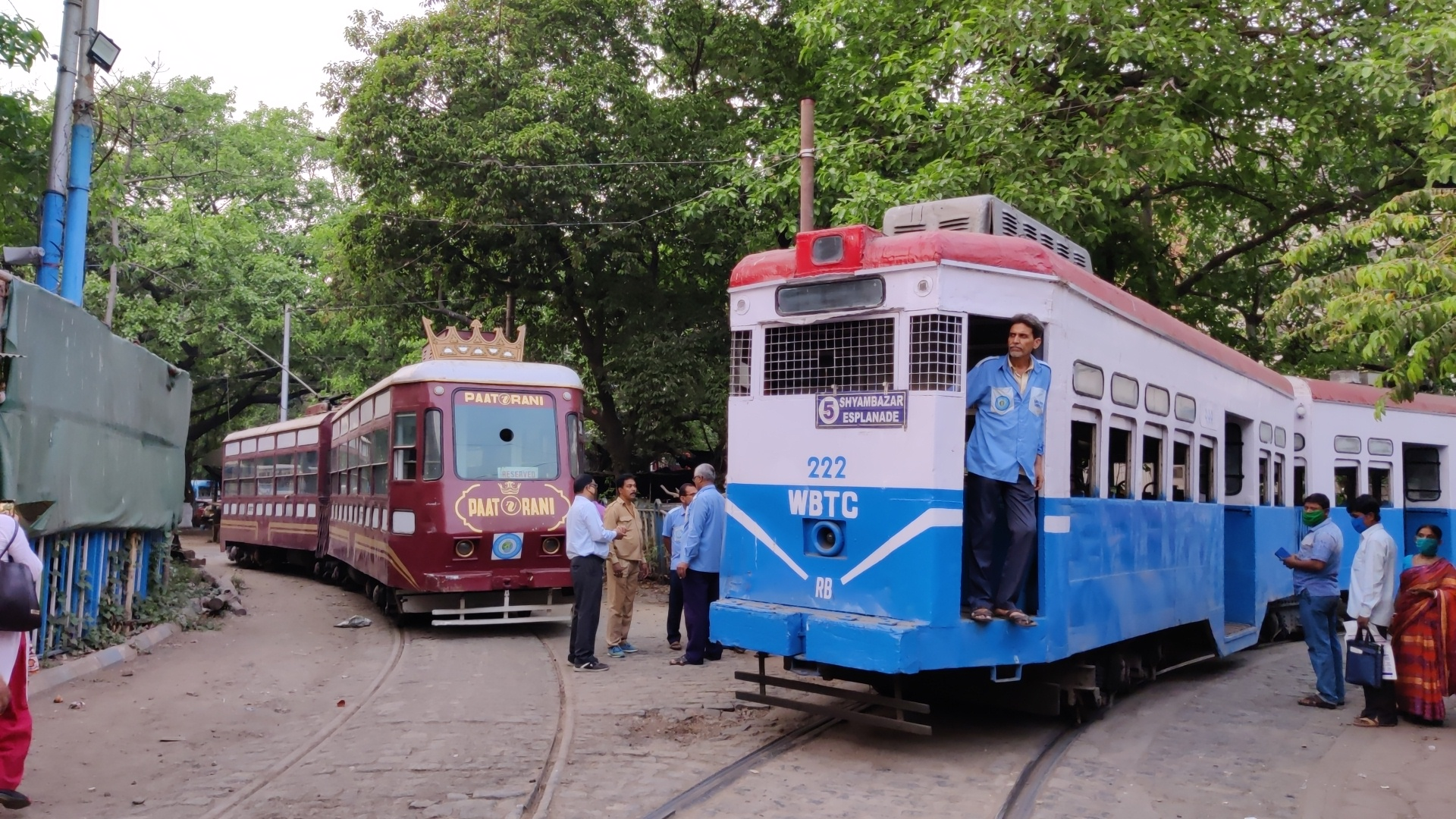
  Esplanade Tram Terminus
- 1882 – Esplanade – Wellington Square – Bowbazar – College Street – Hatibagan – Shyambazar Junction route opened (Later route 5). The connection was improved at Bowbazar Junction for through running trams from Dalhousie Square to Shyambazar (Later route 6). Wellington Square – Moula Ali – Sealdah Station route opened (Later route 12 after extension). Dalhousie Square – Metcalfe Hall – High Court route opened (Later route 14 extension). Direct tram service from Sealdah Station to High Court started. Metcalfe Hall – Howrah Bridge – Nimtala route opened (Later route 19). Direct tram service from Esplanade to Nimtala started. During this period, steam tram service was conceptualised.

=== 1883–1902: Steam trams ===
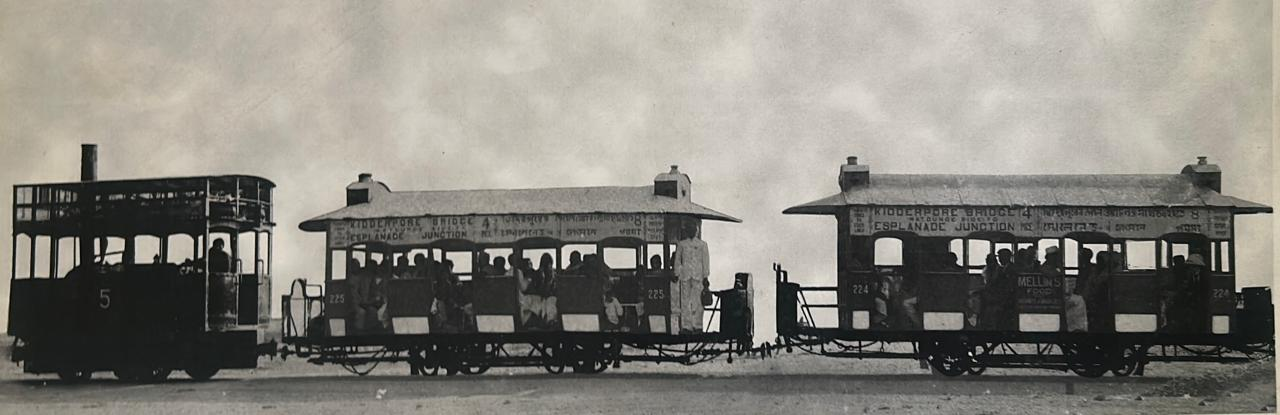
Steam Tram in Kolkata

In 1882, steam locomotives were deployed experimentally to haul tram cars. In the next year a new route opened for steam tram service towards Kidderpore. Tram tracks were laid down via Dufferin Road through maidan, and on reserved track for high-speed steam trams for morning walkers, tourists, race-course goers, and peoples living on those area. Kidderpore tram depot was also constructed at that time, which was also a minor workshop for all steam trams. It was followed by a south-central branch towards from Wellington Square to Park Street via Wellesley Street (now Rafi Ahmed Kidwai Road). After a long sixteen years gap, the Nimtala route was connected with Company Bagan line via Nimtala Ghat Street, and the Esplanade – Nimtala service was changed to steam tram. At this time horse trams ran on Shyambazar, Sealdah, High Court & Kalighat routes, and steam trams ran on Nimtala, Park Street & Kidderpore route. The Esplanade – Wellington Square section and Esplanade – Metcalfe Hall section, were served by both horse and steam trams until 1901. Kidderpore & Kalighat were the only steam & horse tram depot at that time respectively.

By the end of the century, the company owned 166 tram cars, 1,000 horses, seven steam locomotives, and 19 miles of track.

==== Timeline ====
- 1883 – Esplanade – Racecourse – Wattgunge – Kidderpore route opened (Later route 36).
- 1884 – Wellington Square – Park Street route opened (Later route 21 & 22 after extension).
- 1900 – Nimtala – Company Bagan route opened (non-revenue service only). Electrification & conversion to standard gauge was started.

=== 1902–1951: Electric trams ===
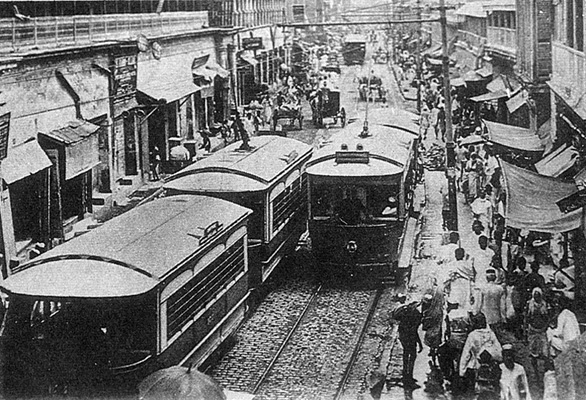
Early electric tram at Chitpore Road (Rabindra Sarani)

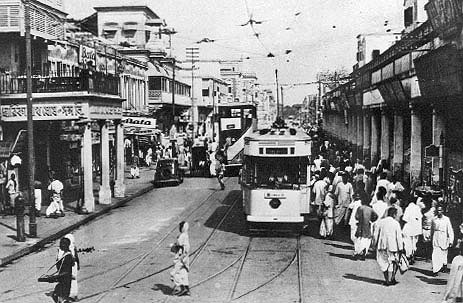
A tram in 1945 at Hatibagan

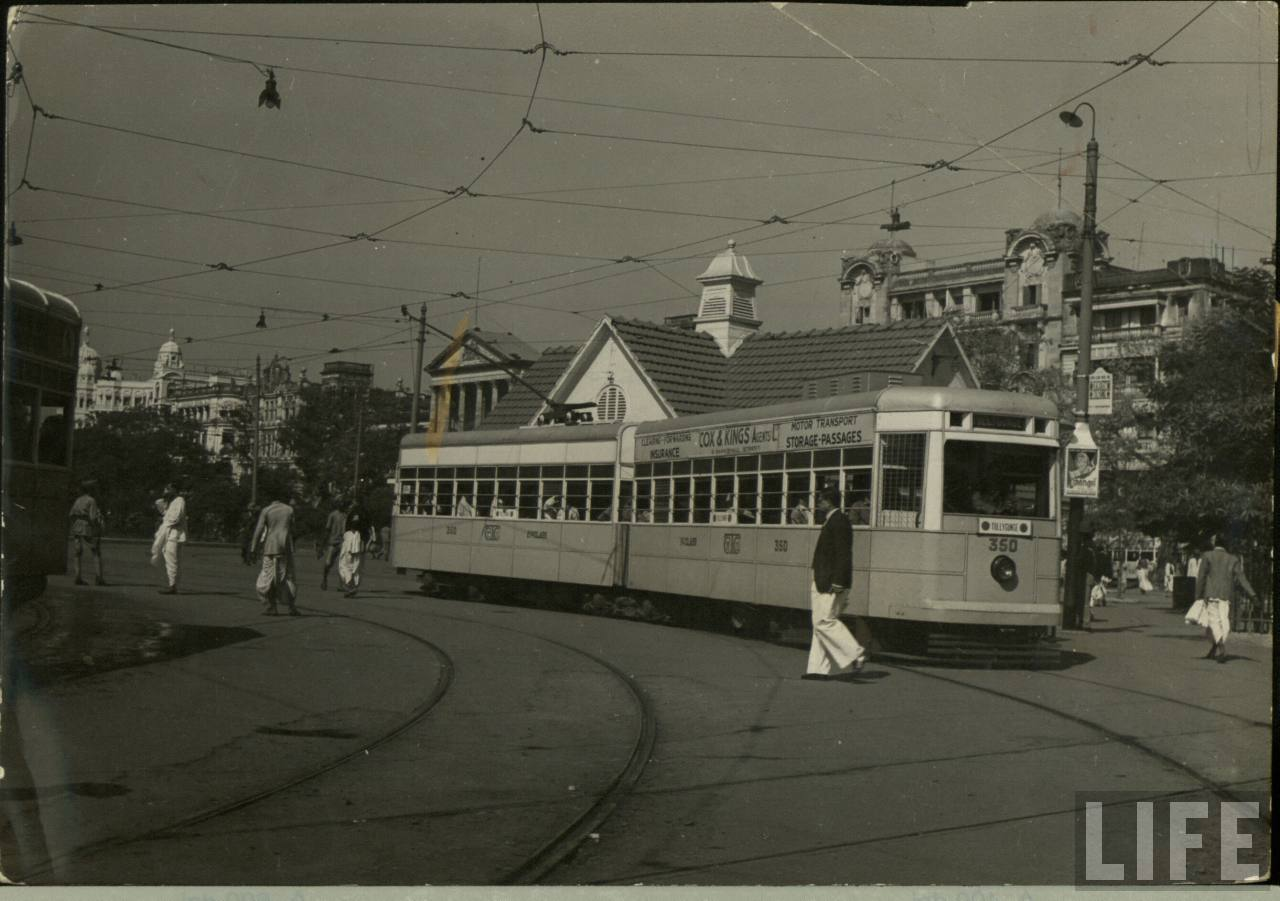
A K Class tram in Esplanade Tram Terminus during British period

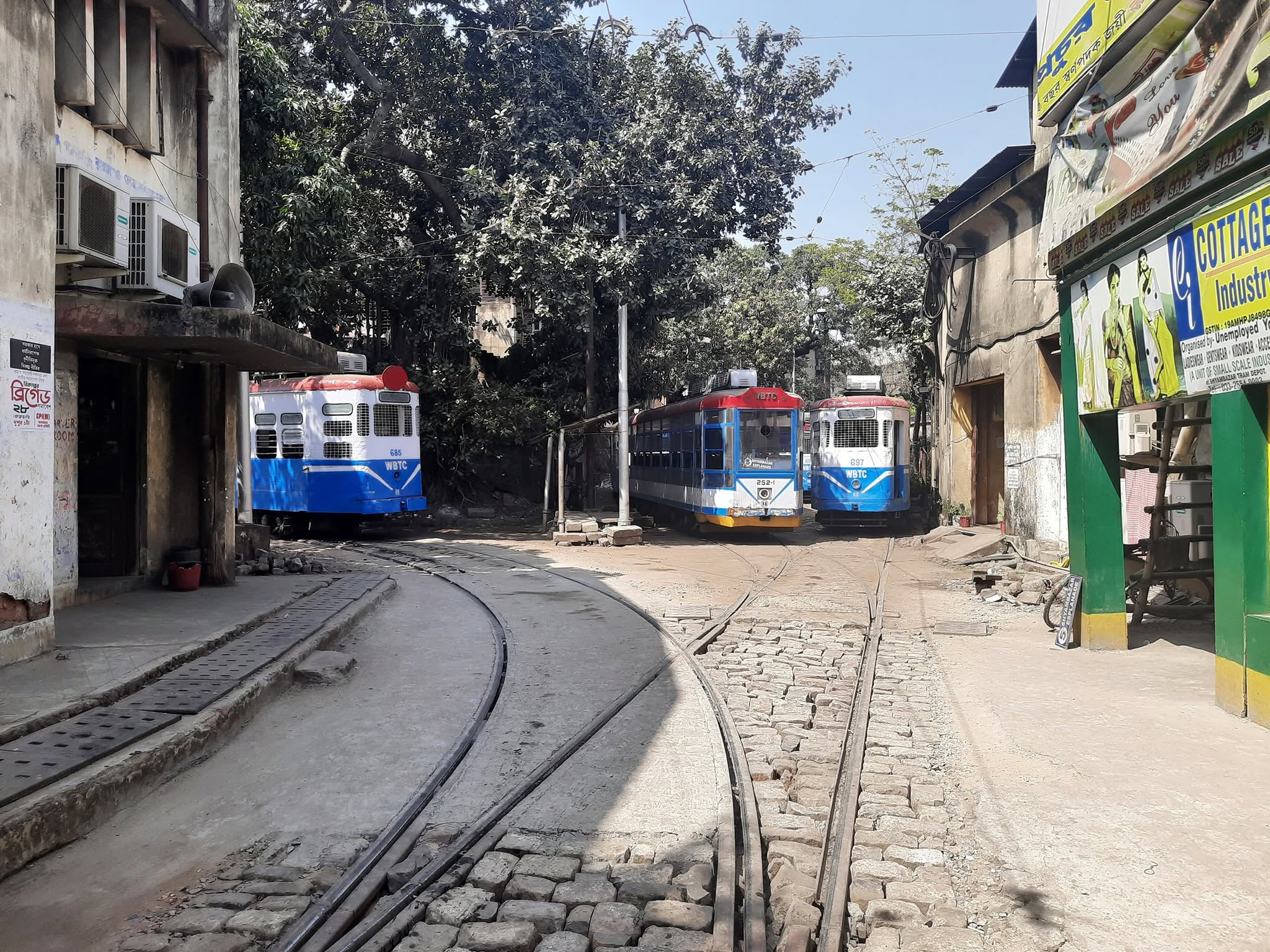
Shyambazar Tram Terminus

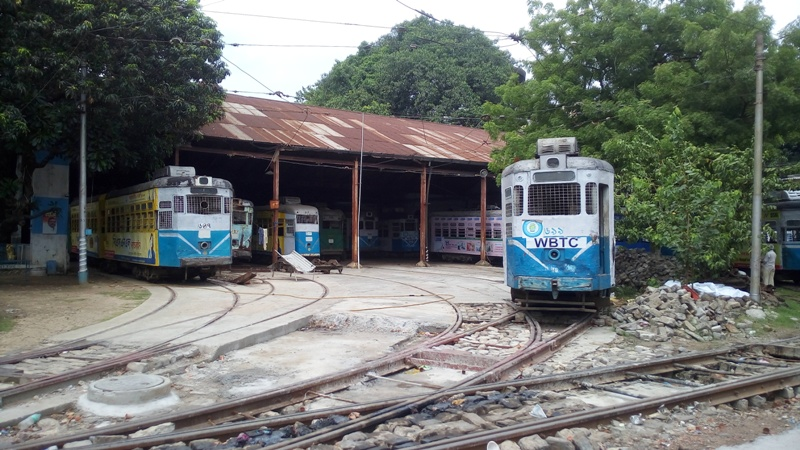
Tollygunge Tram Depot is the southernmost tram depot of Kolkata

In 1900, the electrification of the tramway and conversion of its tracks to 4 ft 8 1/2 in (1,435 mm) (standard gauge) began. The first electric tramcar in Calcutta ran from Esplanade to Kidderpore on 27 March 1902, with service from Esplanade to Kalighat introduced on 14 June of that year. Both Kalighat & Kidderpore tram depot was converted to electric tram depot. The connecting route through Grey Street (now Arabinda Sarani) was opened in that year for a second route between Shyambazar and Esplanade. The Nonapukur Workshop was established also in that year, from where the track connection up to Wellesley Street opened via Elliott Road, after which the Park Street branch closed. Now the major repairing of the horse, steam and electric trams was started at Nonapukur. In next year, the Kalighat line was extended to Tollygunge for serving the then south suburban area and film studios via Russa Road (now Shyama Prasad Mukhopadhyay Road). Tollygunge tram depot was also constructed at that time, which was the largest tram depot in terms of area. The Shyambazar line was also extended to Belgachia for serving the then north suburban area, hospital, and rail yards via Belgachia Road (now Radha Gobinda Kar Road). Belgachia tram depot and Shyambazar tram terminus were also opened in this year. In next year, The Kumortuli line was extended to Bagbazar, after which the Kumortuli terminus was closed. Bagbazar tram terminus was at that place where now a lorry parking area beside the circular railway track. A new route from Sealdah Station to Howrah Bridge via Harrison Road (now Mahatma Gandhi Road) was opened on next year, for serving the businessmen, residents, ferry passengers and railway passengers for Howrah Station. At that time the electrification project was completed.

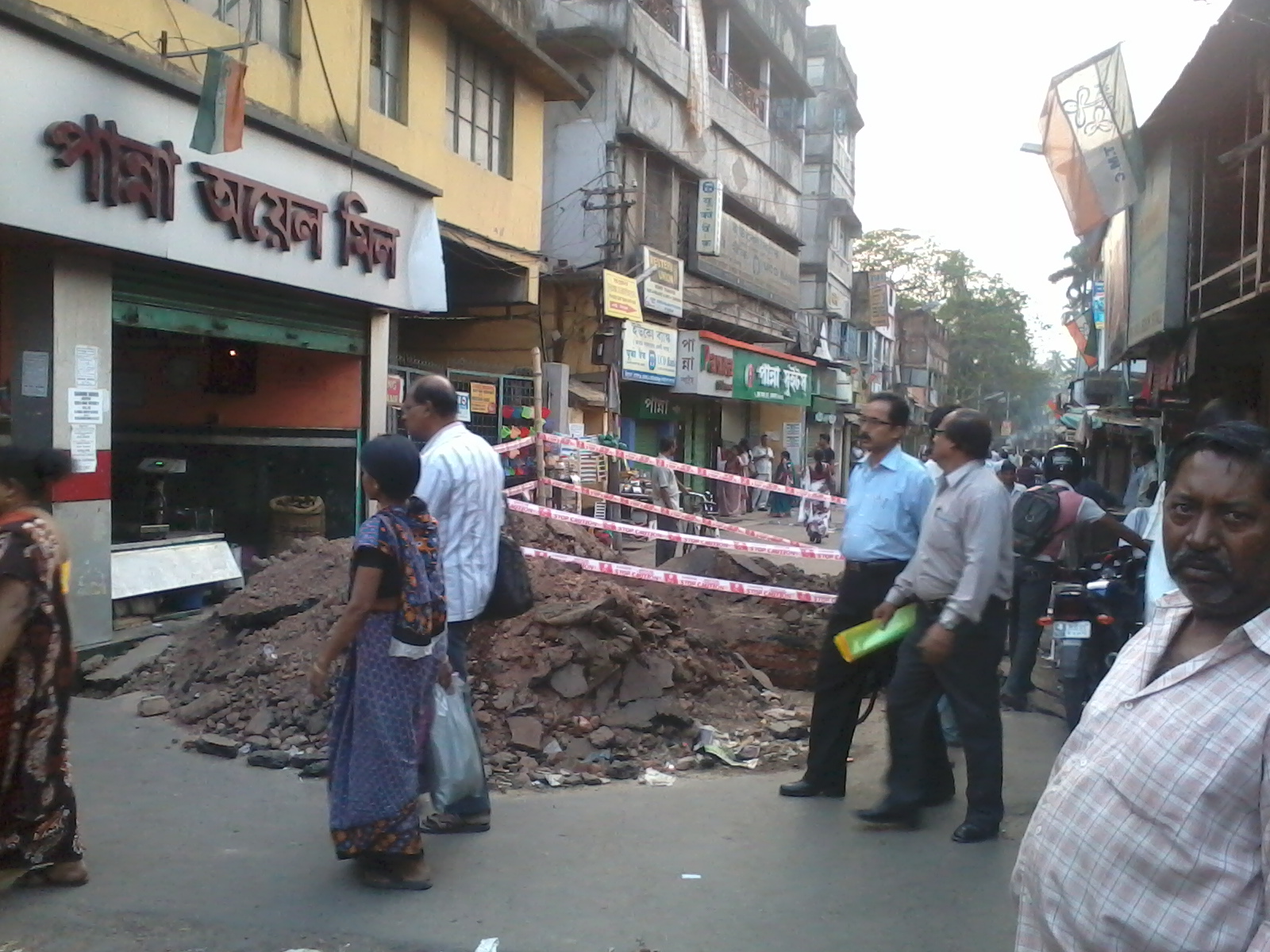
The old Behala Tram Terminus was the only V-shaped terminus

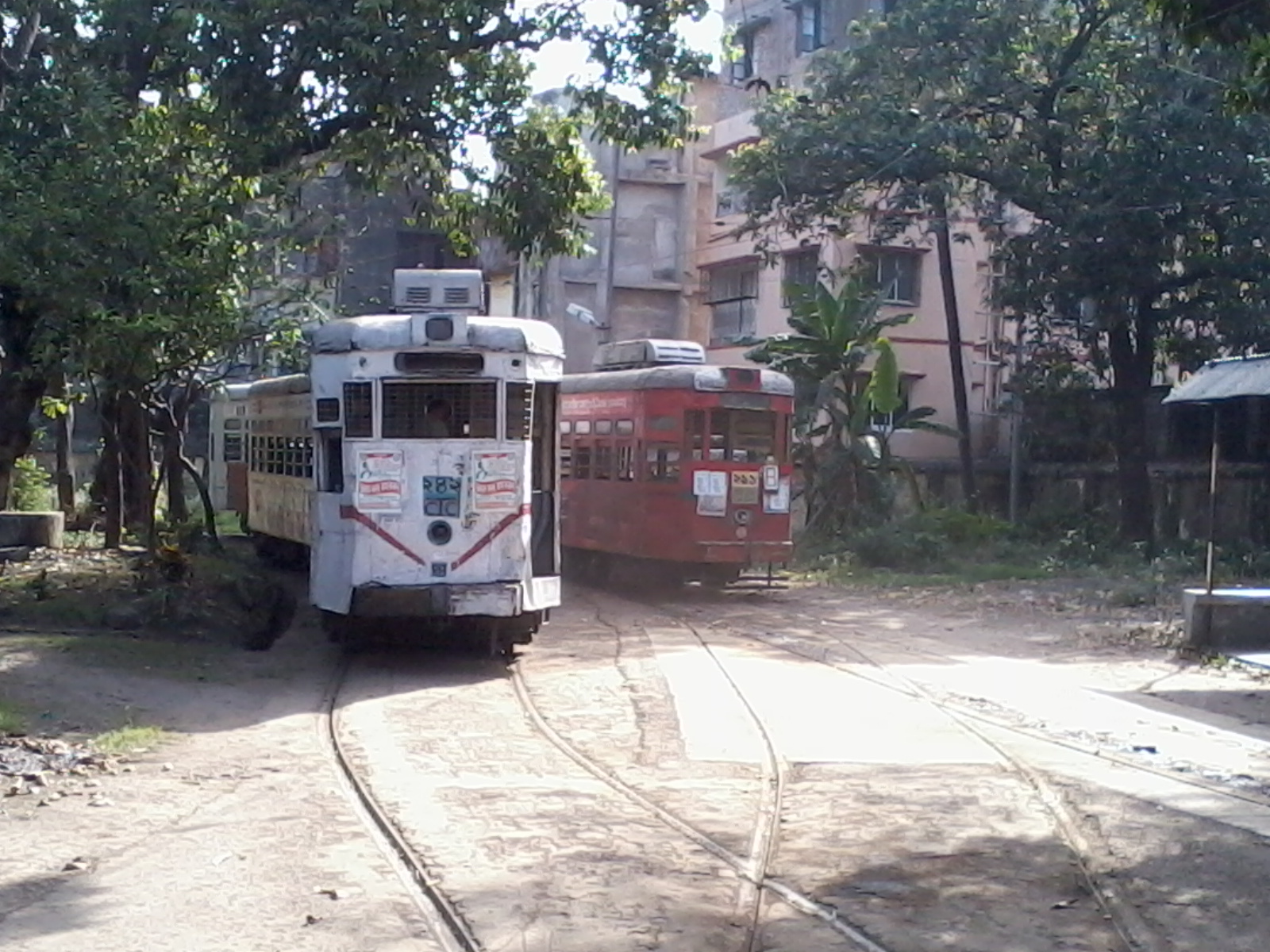
Galiff Street Tram Terminus is the northernmost terminus

Two years later, the connection between Nonapukur and Moula Ali opened via Circular Road (now Acharya Jagadish Chandra Bose Road), and after that tram service started from Nonapukur to Howrah Bridge via Sealdah station. A branch up to Mominpore was also opened from Wattgunge via Diamond Harbour Road, but at that time direct access was constructed through Orphanganjbazar. In next year a new branch was constructed from Shyambazar Junction to Galiff Street via Cornwallis Street (now Bidhan Sarani), and occasional tram service was also started from Galiff Street to Esplanade. Side by side the Mominpore branch was also extended up to Behala, another then south suburban area via Diamond Harbour Road. At that time Behala tram terminus was at right side of Diamond Harbour Road. The connecting route through Alipur Road was also opened in that year for a tram connection between Behala & Kalighat, also a second route between Kalighat and Esplanade.

At that time, tram service was opened in Howrah City. From Howrah Station, two routes were selected. One towards north up to Bandhaghat via Dobson Road (Now Moulana Abul Kalam Azad Road), another towards south up to Shibpore via Grand Trunk Road. For Shibpore route, a single coach double-ended tram was selected due to the lack of creating a loop at Shibpore. For Howrah service, a new depot was constructed at Ghasbagan. Hence then the old Howrah Bridge was a pontoon bridge, it was not possible to connect Kolkata tram and Howrah tram directly.

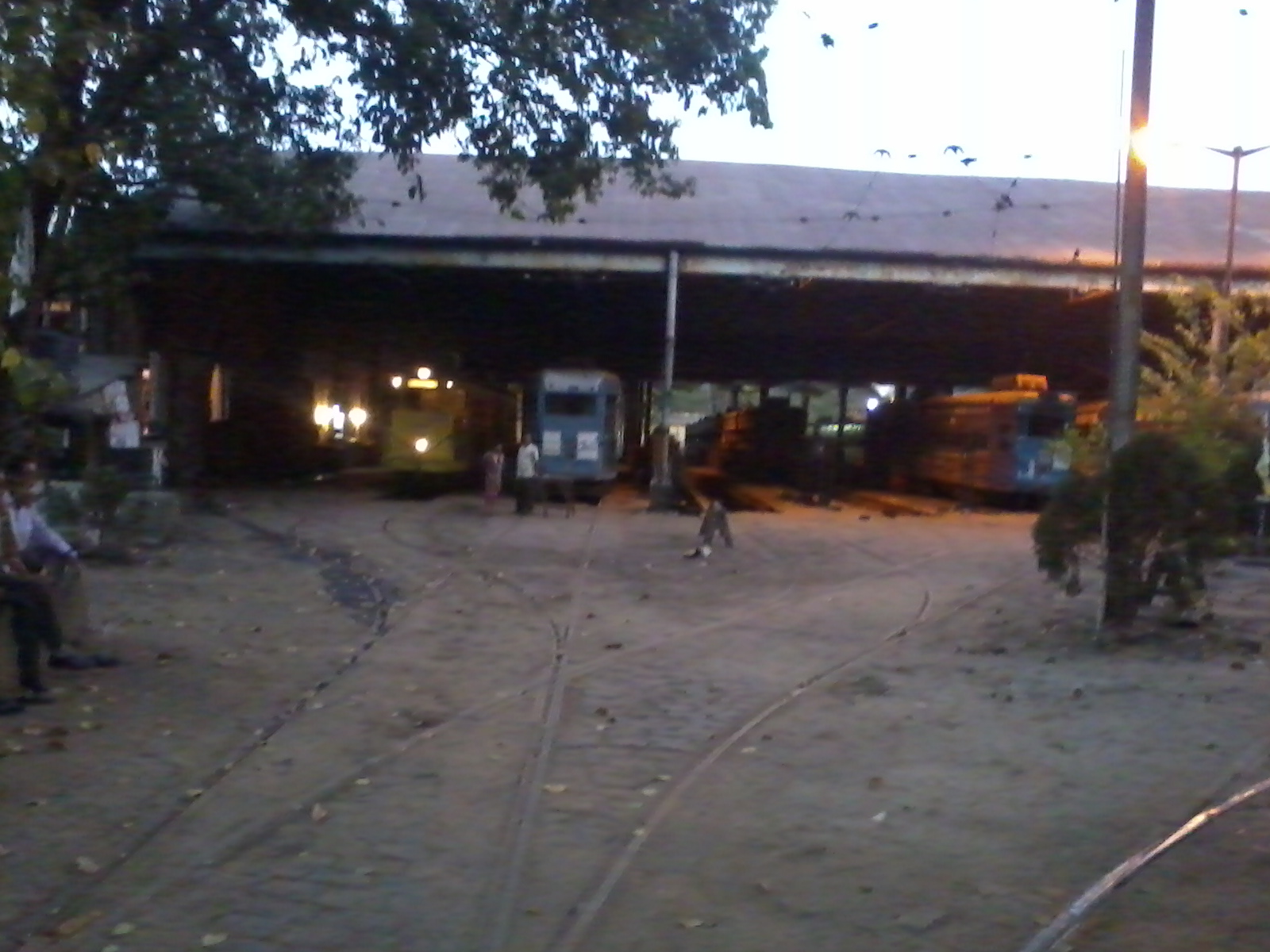
Rajabazar Tram Depot

Two years later, the Sealdah Station to Rajabazar route opened in 1910. Rajabazar tram depot was also constructed at that time, which was the largest tram depot in terms of track number.

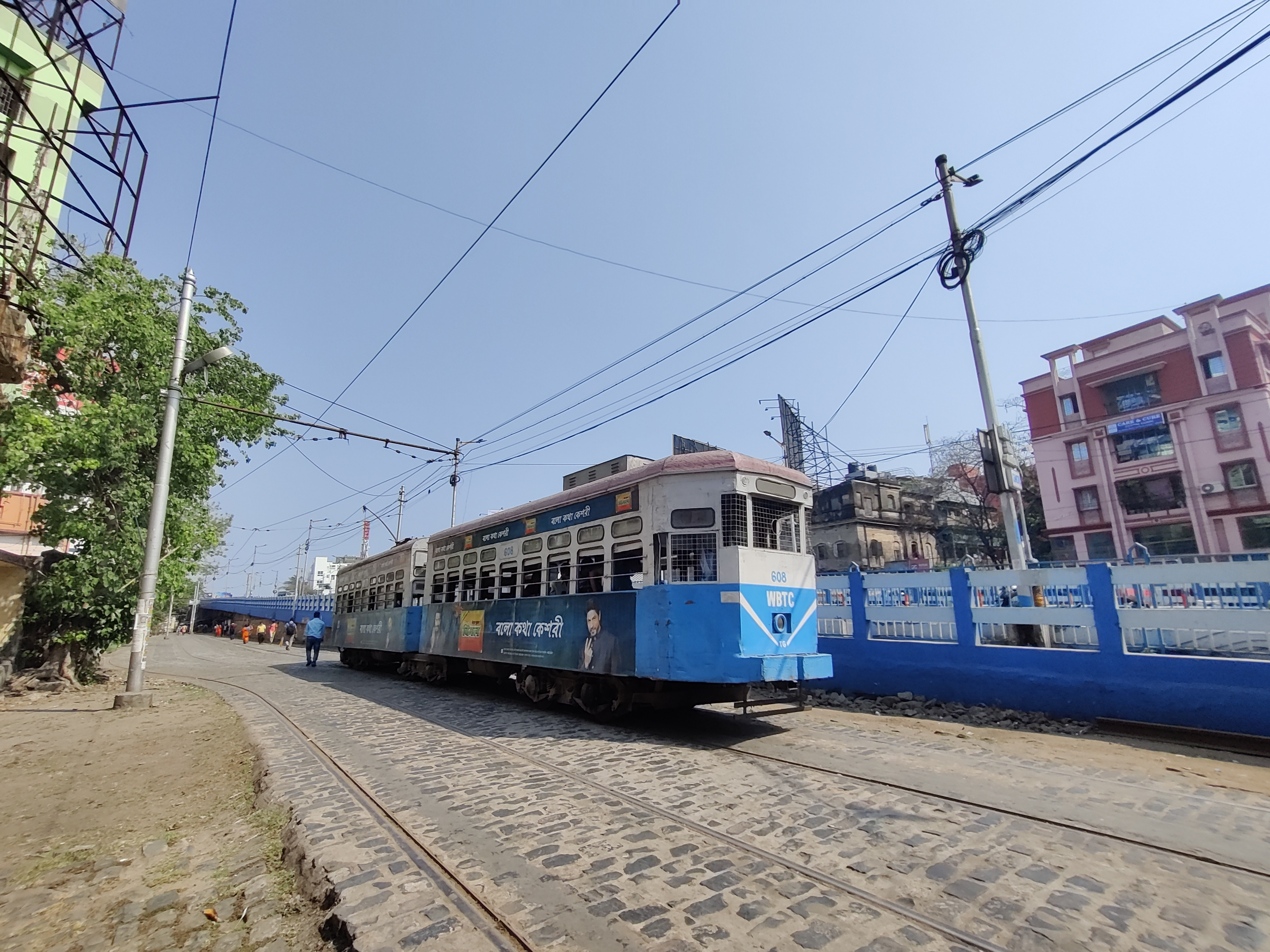
Ballygunge Tram Terminus, the easternmost terminus

After a long 15 years gap, new tram route construction had started again in 1925. The Nonapukur line was extended to Park Circus via Park Street for serving residents and circus goers of that area. Park Circus tram depot was also constructed at that time. In the next year, the direct access of the Behala line via Orphanganjbazar was replaced by present alignment via wattgunge junction for smooth tram service. A new terminus near Racecourse was constructed in next year for race special trams towards Belgachia, Bagbazar, Galiff Street, Rajabazar, High Court, Nimtala, Park Circus, Tollygunge, Behala & Kidderpore. In the next year, a new branch was constructed from Kalighat to Ballygunge, another then south suburb of Kolkata via Rasbihari Avenue.

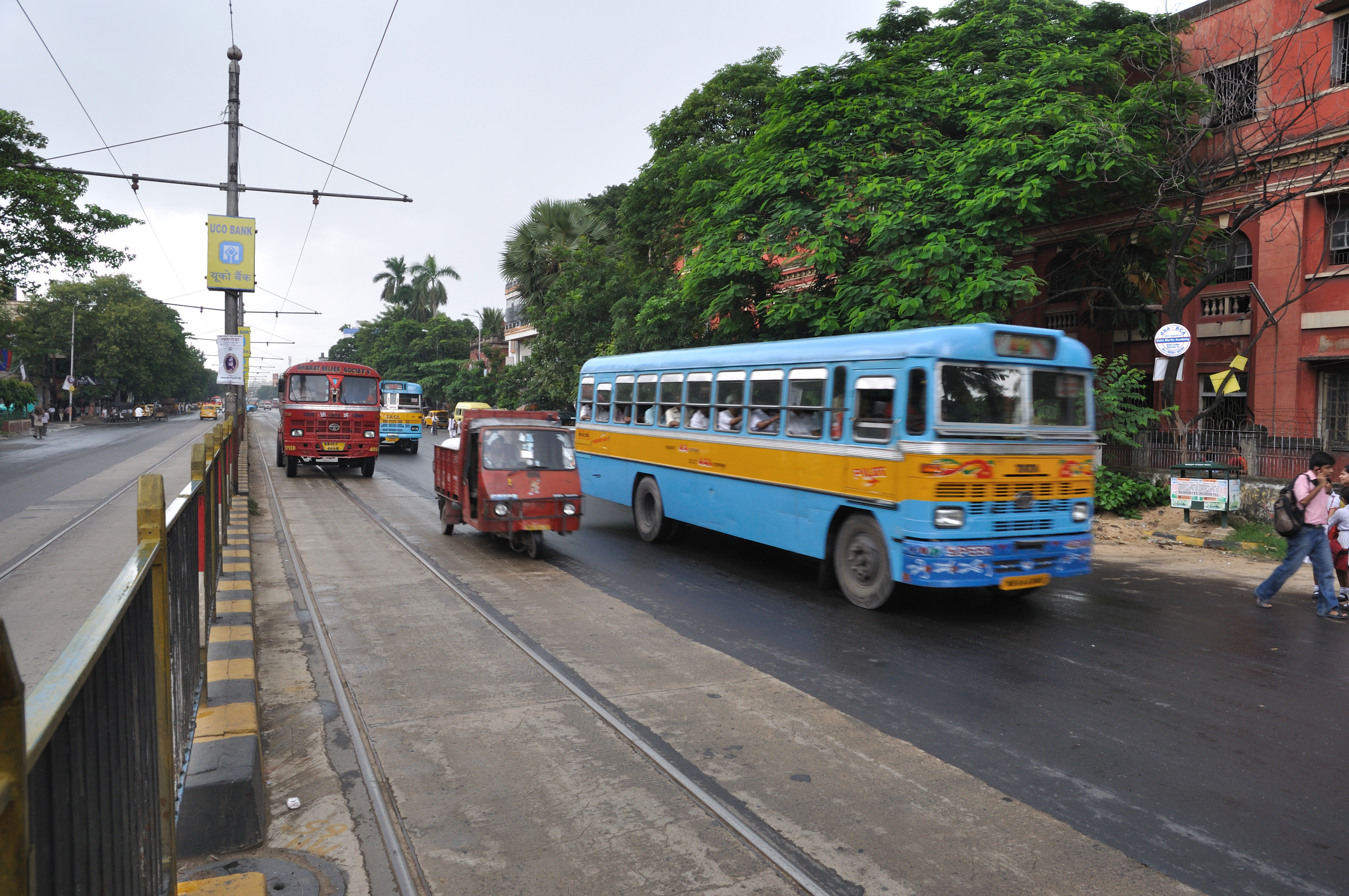
Tram tracks on APC Roy Road

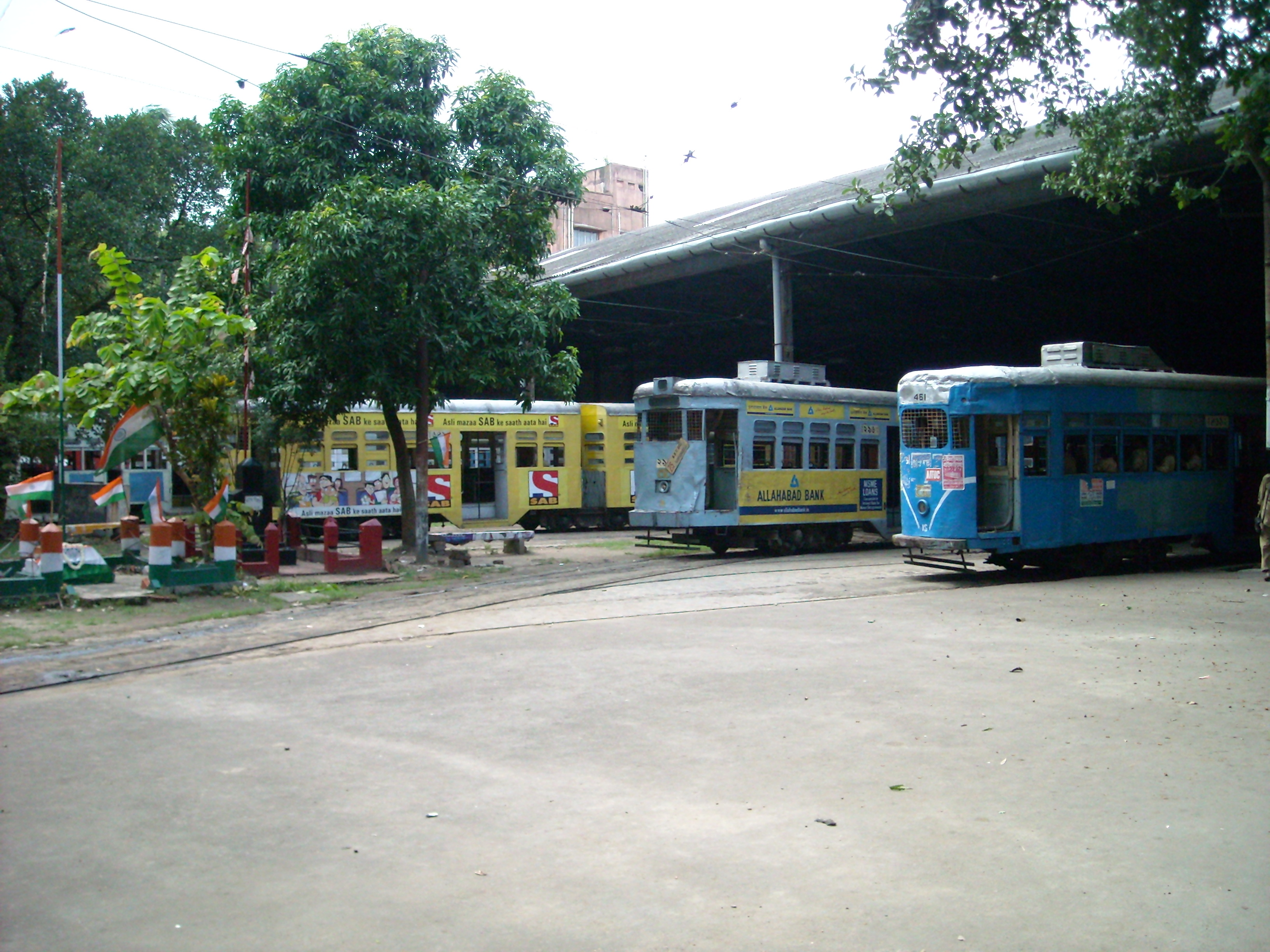
Gariahat Tram Depot is the newest tram depot

After again a long 13 years gap, new tram route construction had started again in 1941. The Rajabazar line was extended to connect with Galiff Street line at Shyambazar junction via Circular Road (now Acharya Praphulla Chandra Ray Road). Two years later, when new Howrah Bridge was opened, tram service started crossing the river Hooghly and connecting Kolkata & Howrah tram network. Very few times trams from Shibpore and Bandhaghat came towards Esplanade and Rajabazar. In the same year, the Park Circus line was extended to connect with the Ballygunge line at Gariahat junction via Gariahat Road (now Syed Amir Ali Avenue). Gariahat tram depot was also constructed at that time. With this extension, total track length reached 42.0 miles (67.59 km).

=== 1951–1990: Nationalisation ===
In 1951, the government of West Bengal entered an agreement with the Calcutta Tramways Company, and the Calcutta Tramways Act of 1951 was enacted. The government assumed the tramways, reserving the right to purchase the system with two years' notice on 1 January 1972 or at any time thereafter. After Independence, during the partition of India, the number of people started dramatically increasing on the roads of Kolkata due to a lot of refugees. The city centre area started getting congested due to the increasing number of buses and cars. So tram company thought to shift the tram tracks of Dalhousie Square from outside to the inside of the square. It was completed in 1952. It was followed by redesigning of Esplanade terminus in 1960, also due to increasing number of pedestrians and automobiles. At that time, there were five ways of tram routes from Esplanade, i.e. – Bentinck Street, Dharmatala Street (now Lenin Sarani), Chowringhee Road (now Jawaharlal Nehru Road), Dufferin Road and Old Court House Street, and three ways of tram routes from Dalhousie Square, i.e. – Old Court House Street, Hare Street & Lalbazar Street. Four years later, the old Majherhat bridge was replaced by a new bridge with tram tracks.

The Calcutta Metropolitan Planning Organisation (CMPO) introduced a plan in 1964 for a new network called "Aerorail". Light rail vehicles would make use of viaducts in the city centre on two axes. These vehicles were to be compatible with the existing tram system, and the viaducts would have been built in stages. The plan was shelved because of opposition, expecting unforeseen difficulties. In 1967, the Government of West Bengal passed the Calcutta Tramways Company (Taking Over of Management) Act and assumed management on 19 July. Until that time, it was the golden age of Kolkata, with maximum number of rolling stocks, route kilometers and passengers. Some 415 trams were in daily service, out of a total of 459.

=== Decline ===
The decline of tram networks started in India during the early thirties, when the Kanpur tram was closed. However other cities had continued trams, but mass closure started from the mid-fifties to mid-sixties, when tram networks of Chennai, Delhi, and Mumbai gradually closed. Overall in the world, at that time, trams were thought of as an old technology and inflexible. The number of automobiles was increasing, so it started occupying tram tracks especially on narrow streets, and tram services got hampered. But surprisingly, car and bus drivers started blaming the tram, which was fueled by political leaders. So it was decided to close the entire Kolkata tram network within 1980. On 8 November 1976, the Calcutta Tramways (Acquisition of Undertaking) ordinance was promulgated under which the company (and its assets) was nationalized.

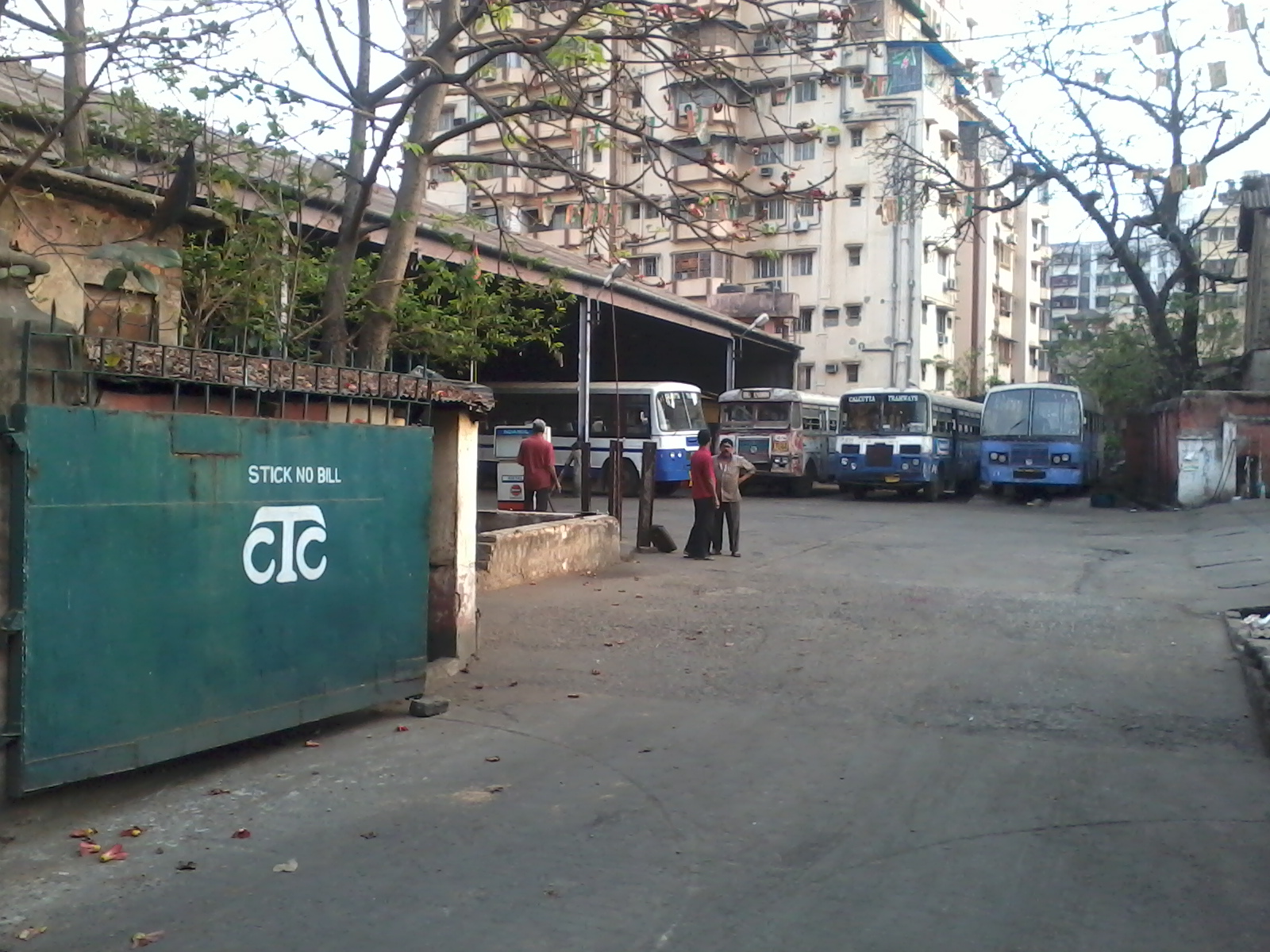
The former Ghasbagan Tram Depot is now a bus depot

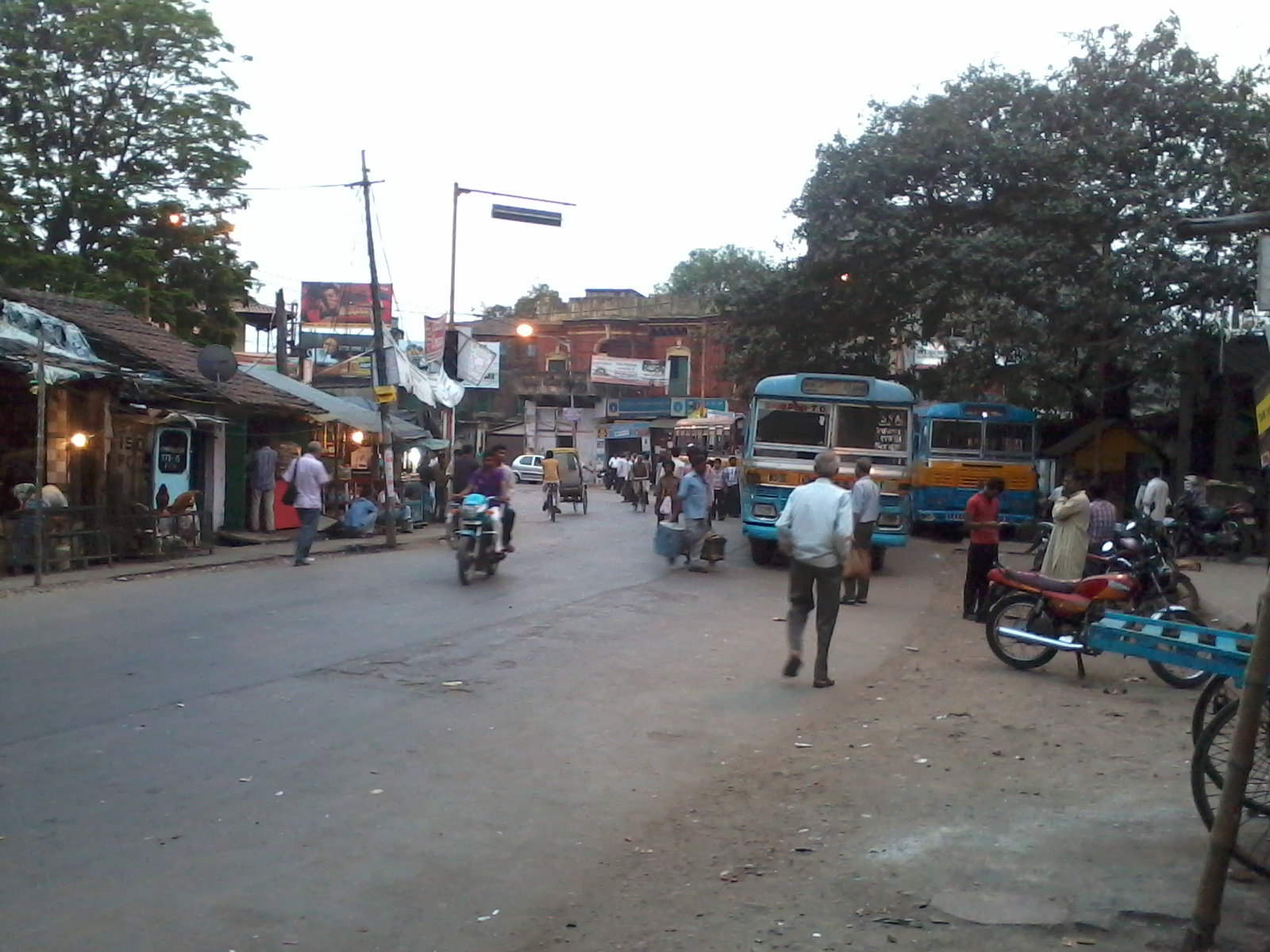
The former Shibpore Tram Terminus

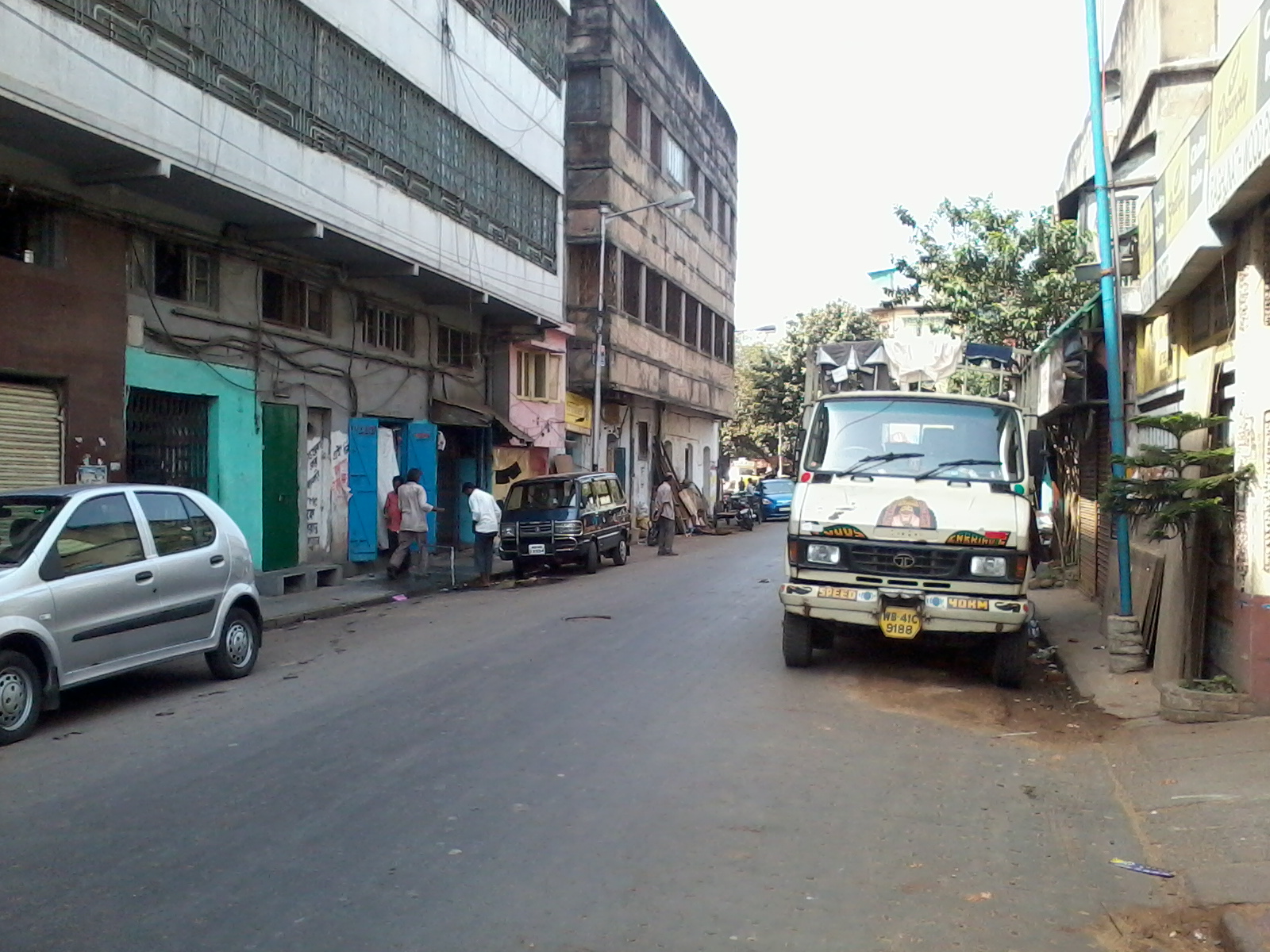
The former Nimtala Tram Terminus

The Howrah sections were decided to close first, because the government thought trams were creating traffic jams on narrow streets of Howrah city. So in 1971, both the Bandhaghat and Shibpore lines were closed, including the Ghasbagan tram depot. The depot got vacant and abandoned for some vehicle dumping place. However the Howrah station terminus survived, but it was started redesigning largely. All single and double coach trams were transferred to Kolkata area. In Kolkata, a new tram terminus was constructed in Behala, this time on the left side of Diamond Harbour Road for no need for reversing the tram. Two years later, Nimtala route along Company Bagan (now Rabindra Kanan) section was closed in May 1973, and the Howrah Station terminus redesigning completed in 1976. The racecourse terminus was also closed due to the construction of 2nd Hooghly Bridge (now Vidyasagar Setu). Total track length was now reduced to 38 miles (61.2 km).

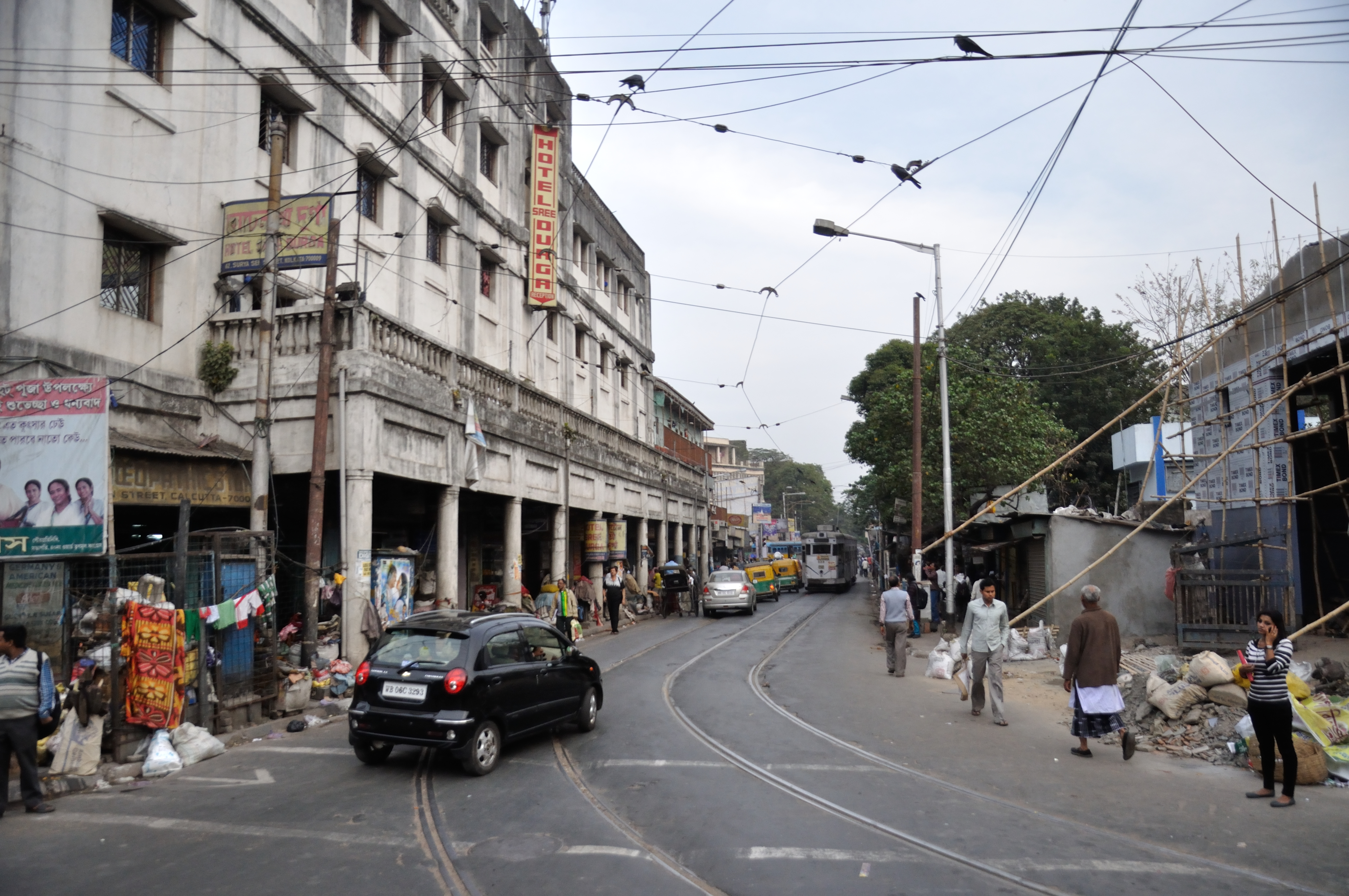
The diverted tram route through Surya Sen Street, recently became one way for tram, now temporarily suspended for metro line 2.

However, tram service was survived in Kolkata, largely supported by then transport minister Rabin Mukherjee, and also due to high rise of oil prices in the international market, which make costly for automobiles. Internationally some cities were started returning tram for this economical reason. Since 1978, line 1 of Kolkata metro construction was started by the cut & cover method. It was needed the construction of a large trench through the planned route, which was mostly served before by tram. So it was thought to temporarily close the tram service along those routes. Later it was planned to part of the tram routes in south Kolkata would remain opened because two tram depots - Kalighat & Tollygunge were situated along the tram route, and it was not practical to close those depots and close a number of tram routes for this reason, rather thought to diverse some tram routes. For this reason, tram tracks between Hazra Park (Jatin Das Park) and Esplanade via Planetarium was closed (the 3rd oldest tram route), but all tram routes which were running via Ashutosh Mukhopadhyay Road and Jawaharlal Nehru Road were diverted via Biplabi Ganesh Ghosh Sarani, Alipur Road, Diamond Harbour Road, Kidderpore Road & Dufferin Road. This closed section was partially reopened in the next year between Planetarium and Esplanade due to protests of passengers, tourists, and hawkers. A new terminus was constructed beside Birla Planetarium. At that time, construction of Sealdah Flyover was started. Due to its low height (for running tram on it), it was decided to close tracks between Sealdah and Lebutala, but diverse this route from Lebutala to Mirzapur (now Surya Sen Street) via Raja Ram Mohan Sarani & Surya Sen Street. In the 1st phase, tram service opened between Mirzapur and Purabi cinema for Howrah Station tram routes, and in the next year from Purabi Cinema to Lebutala for BBD Bag routes. At that time Surya Sen Street was the only tram only street of Kolkata, and the original route previously mentioned (the oldest tram route) with Sealdah Station terminus was closed. For metro line 1 construction, the tracks between Laalbazar and Esplanade via Bentinck Street (the 2nd oldest tram route) was also closed, but all tram routes which were running via Bentinck Street were diverted via Hemanta Basu Sarani & Lalbazar Street. In next year, Sealdah flyover opened with tram tracks on it. It was very few flyovers of the world which had tram tracks.

=== Expansion ===
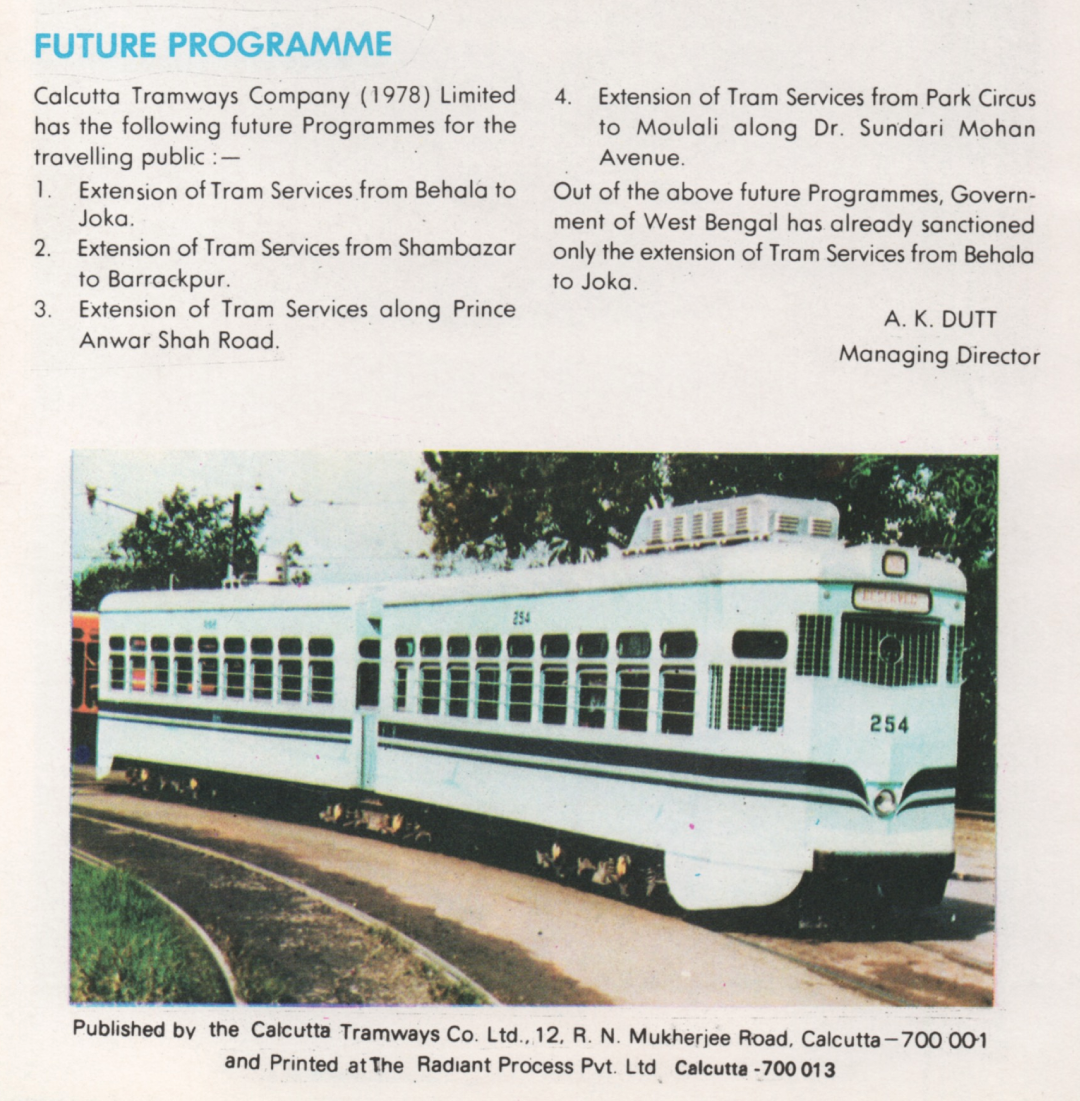
The list of Tram Route Expansion published by the CTC in 1985

After a one decade major closures of the lines, some new routes were planned by government. Then transport minister Rabin Mukherjee proposed some new lines and connecting lines. Those were –

- Maniktala to Bidhannagar
- Behala to Joka
- Galiff Street to Dakshineshwar
- Tollygunge out post to Jadavpur. (via Prince Anwar Shah Road)
- Bidhannagar to Airport
- Kalighat to Taratala (via New Alipore)
- Moula Ali to Park Circus (via Sundari Mohan Avenue)

For first phase, first two lines were selected. On 17 April 1985, tracks were extended 3.7 km (2.30 mi) from Maniktala to Bidhannagar via Maniktala Main Road (now Satin Sen Sarani) and C. I. T. Road. (now Acharya Satyendra Nath Basu Sarani). This route was selected for expanding the Kolkata towards east. At first it was planned that there will be two branches, one to Bidhannagar (Karunamaoyee), another to Airport. However, residents of Bidhannagar were highly against of tram, so that extension was finally cancelled. The Airport extension was also cancelled later. On 31 December 1986, the route extension from Behala to Joka was completed via Diamond Harbour Road. It was the first and only village extension of Kolkata tram network, for developing this area as a city. After opening this line, it was the longest tram route of Kolkata. Unfortunately, this opening created some controversy. The then transport minister Rabin Mukherjee was an MLA of Behala (West), where this route passed. When it was opened, it broke the election code of conduct, and so he was suspended from the post of transport minister before the election. He was a strong supporter of tram, and after his suspension, when new transport minister Shyamal Chakraborty joined, fast declining of Kolkata tram was started again after some years. All the remaining plans were also cancelled at that time.

==== Timeline ====
- 1902 – Kidderpore & Kalighat routes were electrified. Shobhabazar – Hatibagan connecting route opened (Later route 9 & 10), alternative service was started from Shyambazar to Esplanade and Dalhousie Square via this route. Nonapukur Workshop opened with Royd Street – Nonapukur route opening (Later route 21 & 22 after re-extension). Direct tram service from Nonapukur to Dalhousie Square started. Royd Street – Park Street closed.
- 1903 – Shyambazar terminus opened with Shyambazar – Belgachia route opened (Later route 1, 2, 3, 4 & 11). Direct tram service from Belgachia to Esplanade & Dalhousie Square started. Kalighat – Tollygunge route opened (Later route 29 & 32). Direct tram service from Tollygunge to Dalhousie Square started.
- 1904 – Kumortuli – Bagbazar route opened. Kumortuli terminus closed (Later route 7 & 8). Direct tram service was started from Bagbazar to Esplanade and Dalhousie Square.
- 1905 – Howrah Bridge – Chitpore – College Street – Purabi Cinema – Sealdah Station route opened (Later route 15). The connection was improved at Chitpore Junction and College Street Junction for through running trams from Howrah Bridge to Esplanade (Later route 21) and Howrah Bridge to Shyambazar (Later route 11). Semi Circular service from High Court to Esplanade via Sealdah started. All remaining then-opened routes were electrified.
- 1907 – Moula Ali – Nonapukur route opened (Later route 20 & 26 after extension). Direct tram service started from Nonapukur to Howrah Bridge. wattgunge – Mominpore route opened (via direct access through Orphanganjbazar) (Later route 31).
- 1908 – Shyambazar Junction – Galiff Street route opened (Later route 12). Howrah Station – Ghasbagan - Bandhaghat. (Later route 41 & 42) and Howrah Station – Shibpore route opened (Later route 40). Hazra Park – Mominpore – Behala old terminus route opened (via Majherhat old bridge) (Later route 27 & 35). Direct tram service started from Behala to Esplanade and Behala to Kalighat. The connection was improved at Mominpore Junction for alternative service was started from Kalighat to Esplanade and Dalhousie Square via this route (Later route 31).
- 1910 – Sealdah Station – Mirzapur – Rajabazar route opened. (Later route 12) Direct tram service started from Rajabazar to Esplanade. The connection was improved at Sealdah Junction for through running trams from Rajabazar to High Court (Later route 14).
- 1925 – Nonapukur – Park Circus route opened (Later route 20, 21 & 22).
- 1926 – Orphanganjbazar direct access was replaced by present alignment via Wattgunge Junction.
- 1927 – Racecourse terminus built for race special tram service.
- 1928 – Kalighat Junction – Ballygunge route opened (Later route 24 & 27 extension). Direct tram service started from Ballygunge to Tollygunge, Behala, and Dalhousie Square.
- 1941 – Rajabazar – Shyambazar Junction route opened (Later route 12 & 13). Direct tram service started from Galiff Street to Esplanade & Dalhousie Square via Sealdah and/or Moula Ali, also some occasional tram service started from Belgachia to Rajabazar, Belgachia to Bagbazar route.
- 1943 – Howrah Bridge – Howrah Station (via Howrah Bridge) route opened. Route 11, 20, 21, 22, 30 & 32 were extended to Howrah Station. All tram routes which were running up to Howrah Bridge now started going directly up to Howrah station from Belgachia, Galiff Street, Rajabazar, Park Circus, Tollygunge, and Kalighat. Occasional tram service also started from Howrah Station to Nimtala & High Court. Gariahat depot opened with Park Circus – Gariahat Junction route opened (Later route 25 & 26). Direct tram service started from Ballygunge to Esplanade & Howrah Station via Park Circus. This was the last tram extension in Kolkata before Indian Independence.
- 1952 – BBD Bag terminus redesigned. The tracks outside the park was now shifted inside the park.
- 1960 – Esplanade terminus redesigned.
- 1964 – The New Majherhat Bridge was built.
- 1971 – Behala new terminus built. Howrah Station – Ghasbagan – Bandhaghat closed, Ghasbagan depot became a goods vehicle stock depot (Route 41 & 42). Howrah Station – Shibpore closed (Route 40).
- 1973 – Howrah Bridge – Nimtala – Company Bagan section closed (Route 19).
- 1976 – Howrah Station terminus redesigned after the closure of Bandhaghat & Shibpore route, converted to the private bus terminus and opening of the pedestrian subway. Racecourse terminus closed.
- 1978 – Esplanade – Planetarium – Hazra Park closed for conversion to metro line 1. All tram services from Tollygunge, Kalighat & some services from Ballygunge were started running via Mominpore & Wattgunge.
- 1979 – Esplanade – Planetarium reopened (Route 12A).
- 1980 – Purabi Cinema – Mirzapur route opened (Route 13 diversion).
- 1981 – Lebutala – Purabi Cinema route opened (Route 14 diversion). Esplanade – Lalbazar closed (Route 3, 7 & 9). Lebutala – Sealdah Station terminus closed for flyover, but trams continued serving Sealdah Station (Route 13 & 14 diversion). Some tram services from Galiff Street, Rajabazar, High Court, Park Circus & Ballygunge were started running via Purabi Cinema.
- 1982 – Sealdah flyover opened, with tram tracks on it.
- 1985 – Maniktala – Bidhannagar old terminus route opened (Route 16 & 17).
- 1986 – Behala – Joka route opened (Route 37). Connection was improved at Maniktala Junction for through running trams from Belgachia to Bidhannagar.

=== 1990–2005: Later developments and mass closures ===
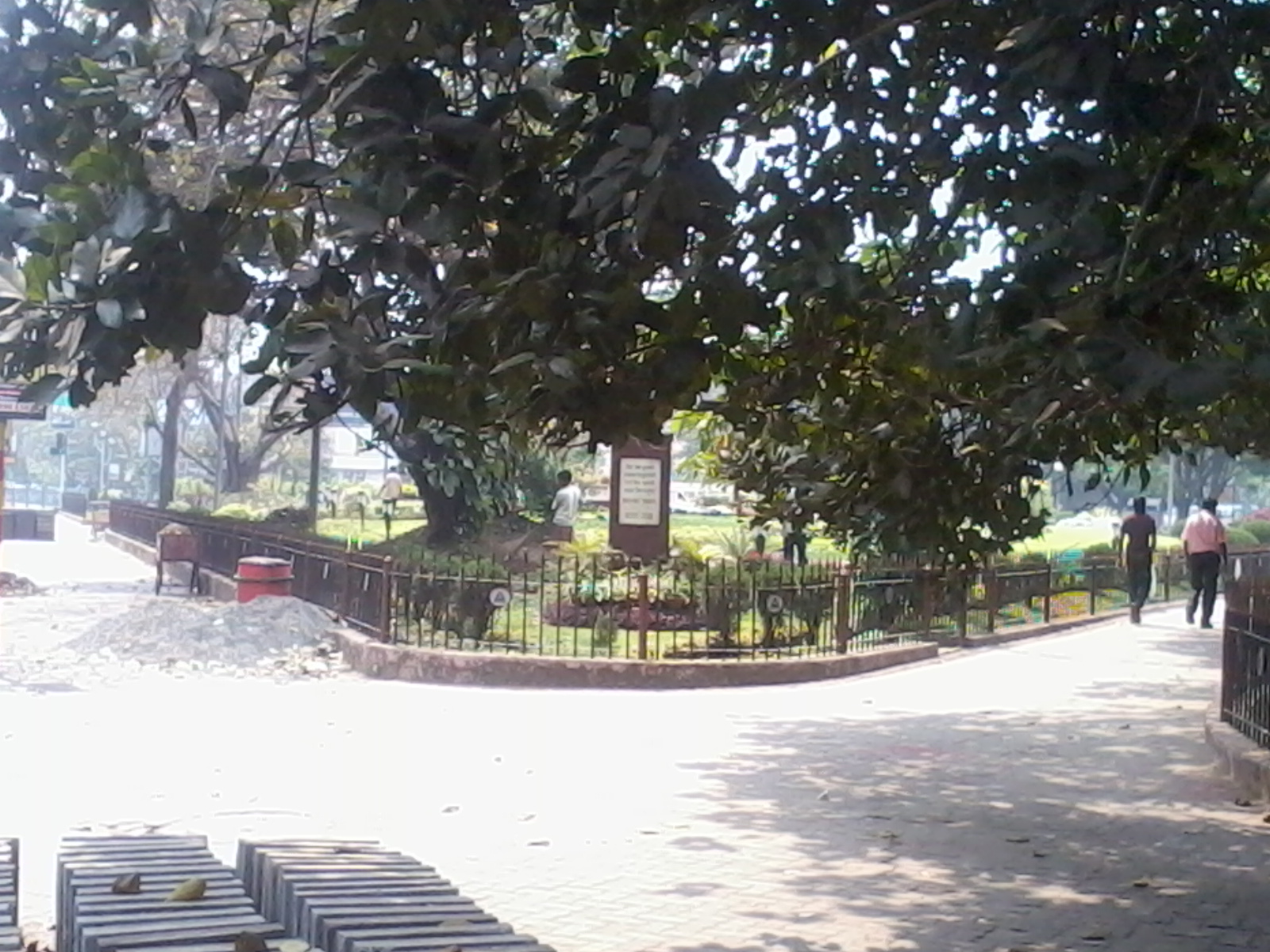
Planetarium Tram Terminus was constructed during construction of metro line 1

Since 1990, losses of Kolkata tram started increasing, and to overcome this, it was thought by government that the entire tram network will be gradually replaced by bus, and lands of depot and terminus will be sold to promoters for construction of high-rise buildings. The Calcutta Tramways Company introduced the bus service on 4 November 1992 with a fleet of 40 buses. The Planetarium line was closed due to excuse of loss making. The terminus was converted to park, however tracks were still present until 2010, and masts are still present, now are being used by lamp posts. After two years, The Howrah Station terminus closed, converted to bus terminus and the tram tracks were removed on Rabindra Setu the following year, since the world's busiest ageing cantilever bridge was not strong enough for trams. The routes which terminated there were moved back to the Burrabazar (Howrah Bridge) terminus (formerly Burrabazar Junction). Tram tracks from Howrah Bridge terminus to Metcalfe Hall was also closed due to excuse of road repair, and all routes which were served this section was now diverted via Rabindra Sarani. However, in this year a new terminus in Bidhannagar opened near Railway Station.

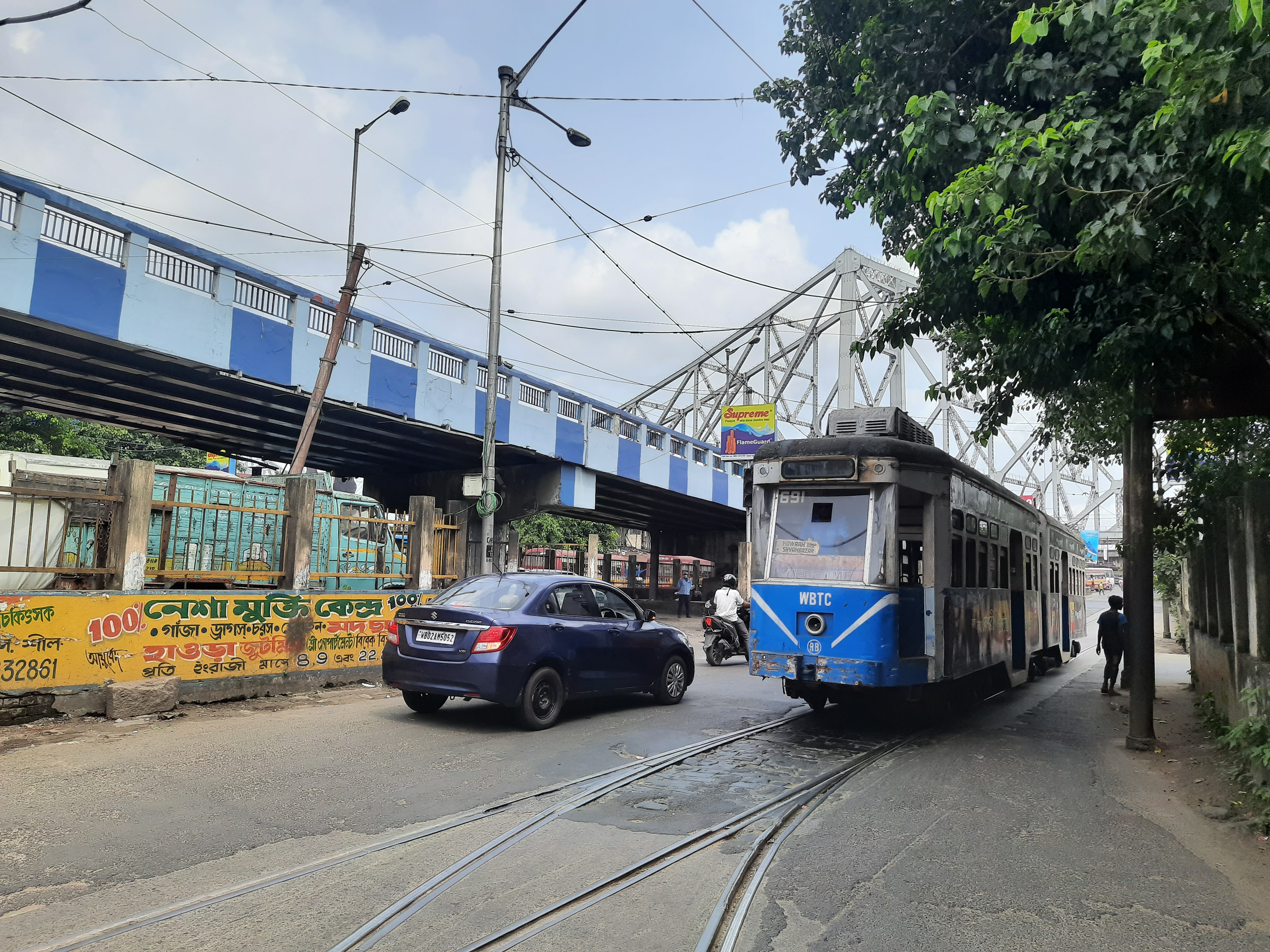
Howrah Bridge Tram Terminus, former Burrabazar junction

The system had degraded by the 1990s, and Minister for Transport Shyamal Chakraborty planned to close the network. In 1995, the High Court terminus closed for the reconstruction of Strand Road. Rails and wires were removed from there and from Strand Road, Hare Street, and Shahid Khudiram Basu Road and it is now the site of the newest Kolkata High Court centenary building. However, Melbourne tram conductor Roberto D'Andrea befriended fellow Calcutta conductors during a 1994 visit. When D'Andrea heard about the planned network closure, he suggested an art project called Tramjatra. The project increased public awareness of the network and its value, ultimately saving it at that time.

However closures were continued. In 1998, the Gariahat Depot–Gariahat Junction link on Lila Roy Sarani closed for construction of the Gariahat flyover. It was early planned to relay tram tracks on two sides of the road under the flyover, but it was finally cancelled because of the former Mayor Subrata Mukherjee. During his reign, tram network again got on threat of closure, because he was a strong anti-tram person. Four years later, the Mominpore–Behala route on Diamond Harbour Road was closed for the construction of an flyover in Taratala. Although it was initially planned to relay tracks on the flyover after its completion, the road was later converted to a national highway and the plan was dismissed.

=== 2006–2025: Mass concretisation of tram tracks and more closure of Routes ===
In 2004, state government decided to de-reserve all grass-bed reserved tracks from tram only operation, and replace it by concrete bed. Cobblestone bed tracks were also planned to be replaced by concrete bed. For this reason, Shyambazar to Galiff Street section was closed, and modification of Shyambazar junction done by now tram service could continue from Rajabazar to Belgachia instead of Galiff Street. Rails and overhead lines were removed from part of the Bidhan Sarani route. In 2008, BBD Bag terminus was largely redesigned for construction of underground car parking.

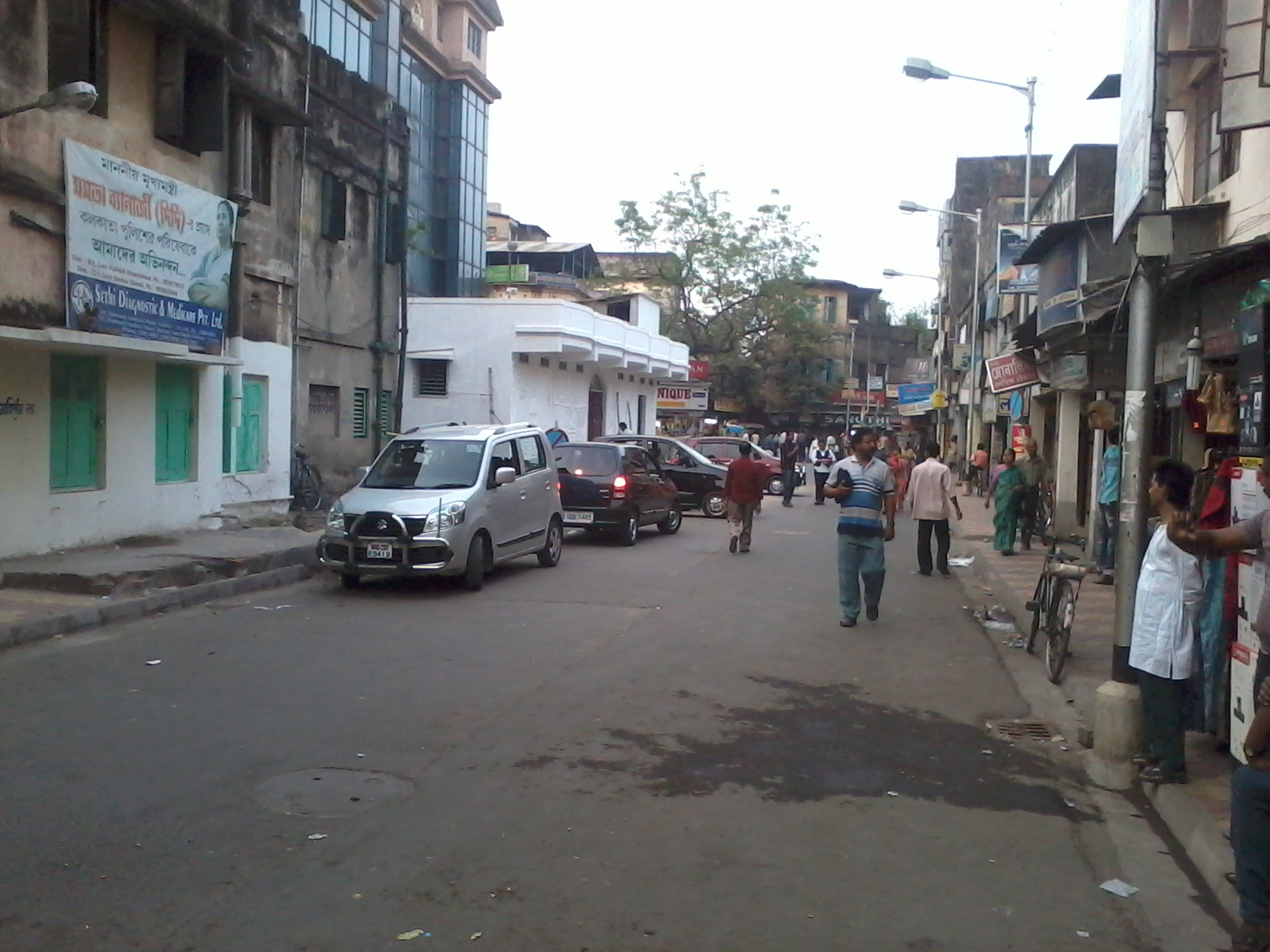
Former Behala Tram Terminus, closed for metro line 3

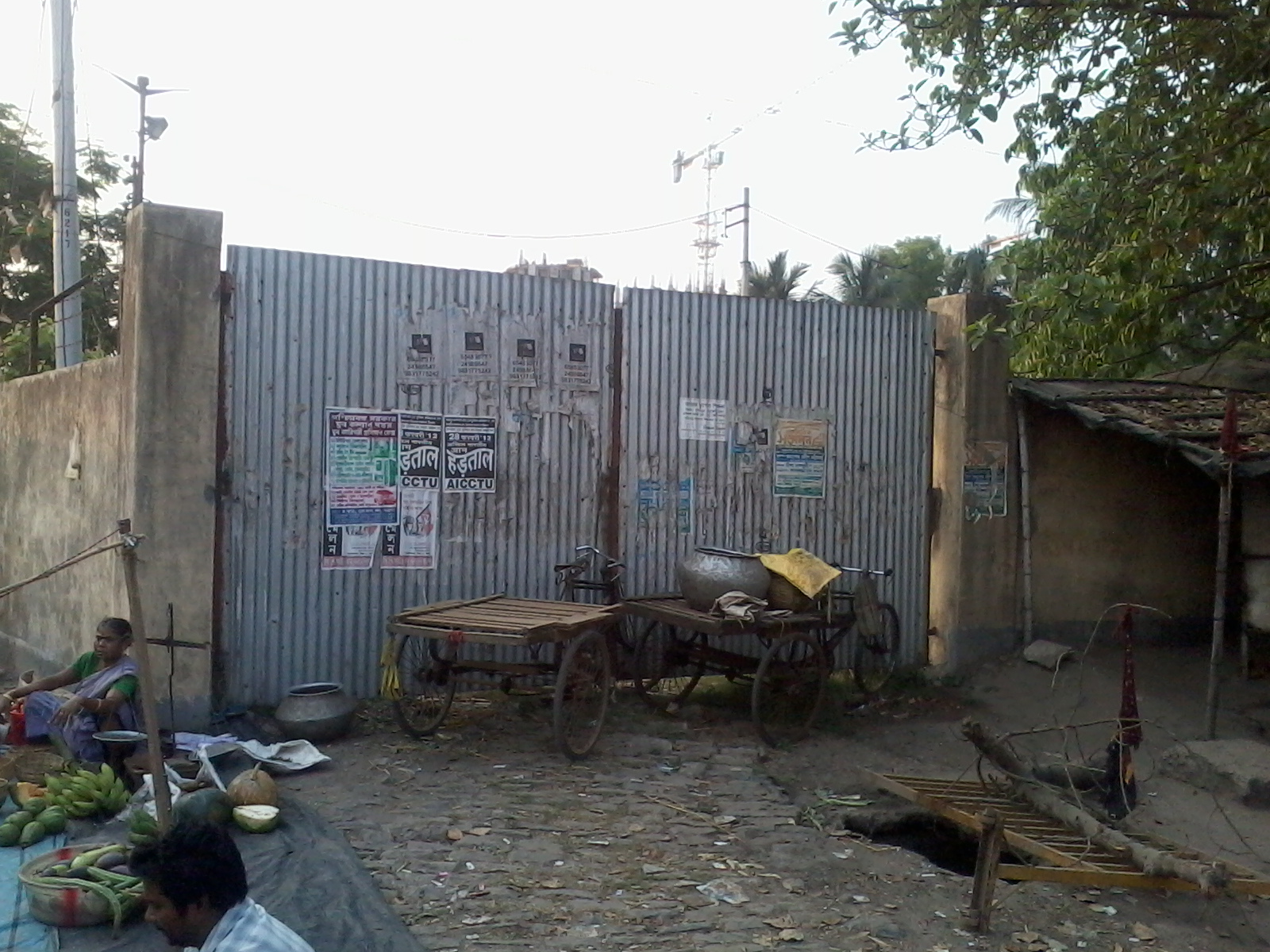
Joka Tram Terminus was the newest terminus of Calcutta Tramways

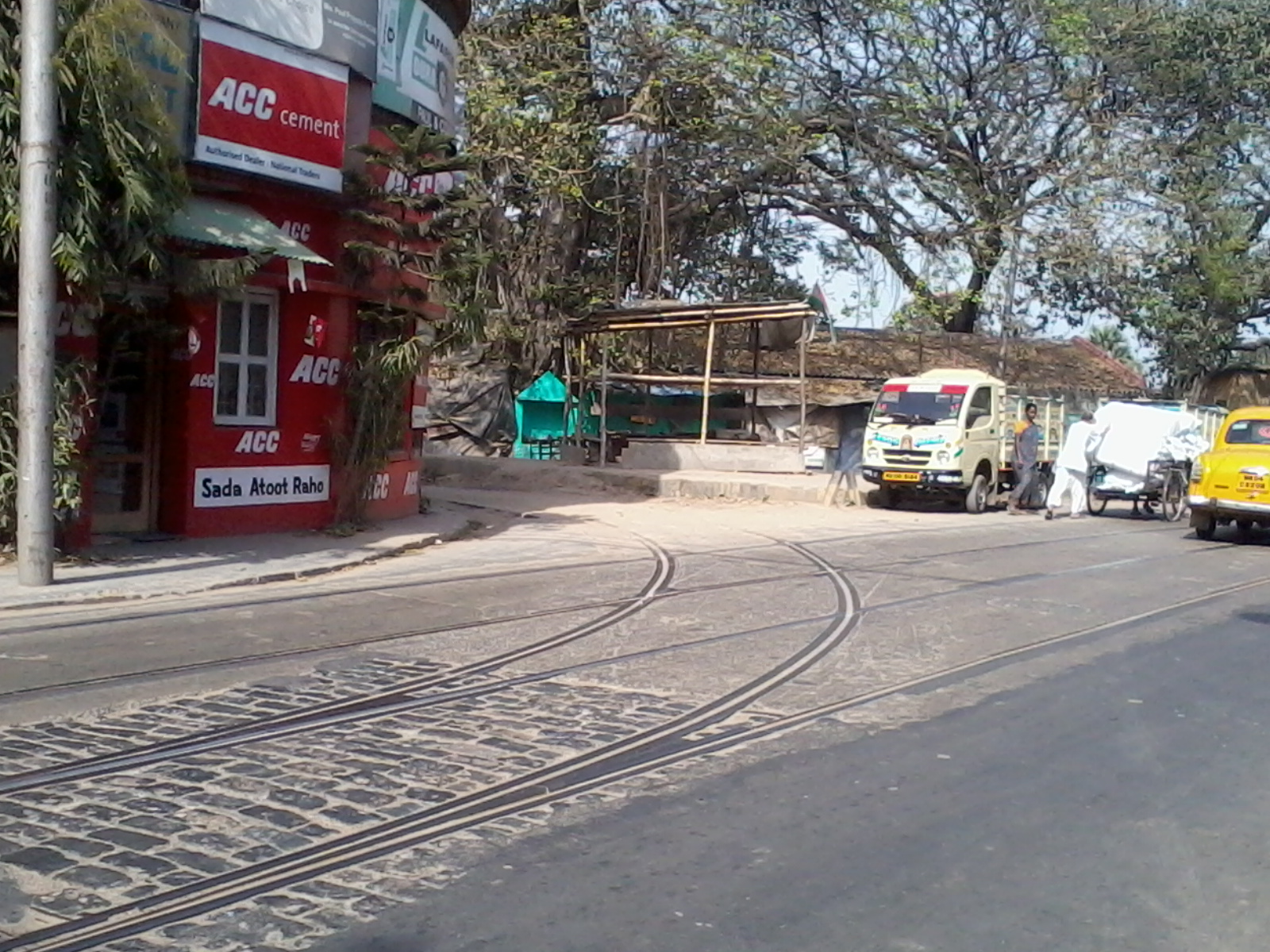
Exit of Bagbazar tram Terminus

Since 2011, line 3 of Kolkata metro construction was started by elevated method. It was needed construction of pillars through the planned route from Majherhat to Joka, which was mostly served before by tram. So the Behala-Joka route closed for construction of the metro line 3. In next year, Bagbazar terminus was closed, due to a legal dispute, and the non-revenue section between Bagbazar and Galiff Street became regular route, and double tracked. Galiff Street Terminus was realigned, irregular service from Bagbazar to Galiff Street became regular service. The Lalbazar-Surya Sen Street down line was closed, but the up line remained. In 2013, 'Charoibeti' and 'Rupasi Bangla', two AC trams, were manufactured at the Nonapukur workshop for heritage tours only. A regular AC tram route would not start until 6 years later. On 30 September 2014, a tram, converted into a museum (Smaranika) in Esplanade, was opened to the public. The Park Circus Depot closed for construction of the Maa Flyover in 2015 and the Nonapukur Depot/Workshop has started regular service; the Gariahat Depot remained. The following year, the Ballygunge Station Depot next to Gariahat Mall also reopened and thus Kalighat/Rashbehari-Ballygunge Station stretch (via Gariahat) became active after 12 years.

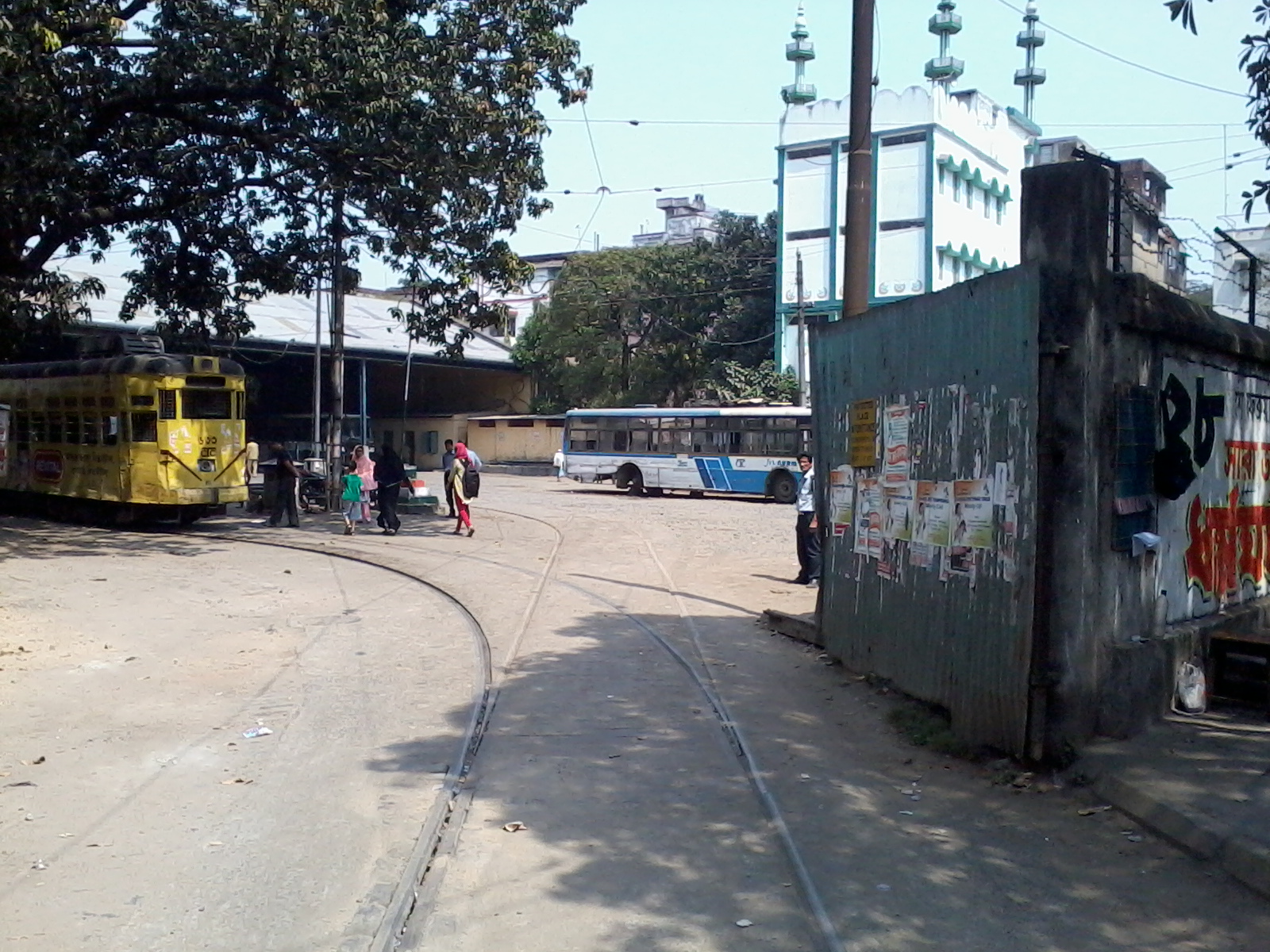
Park Circus Tram Depot

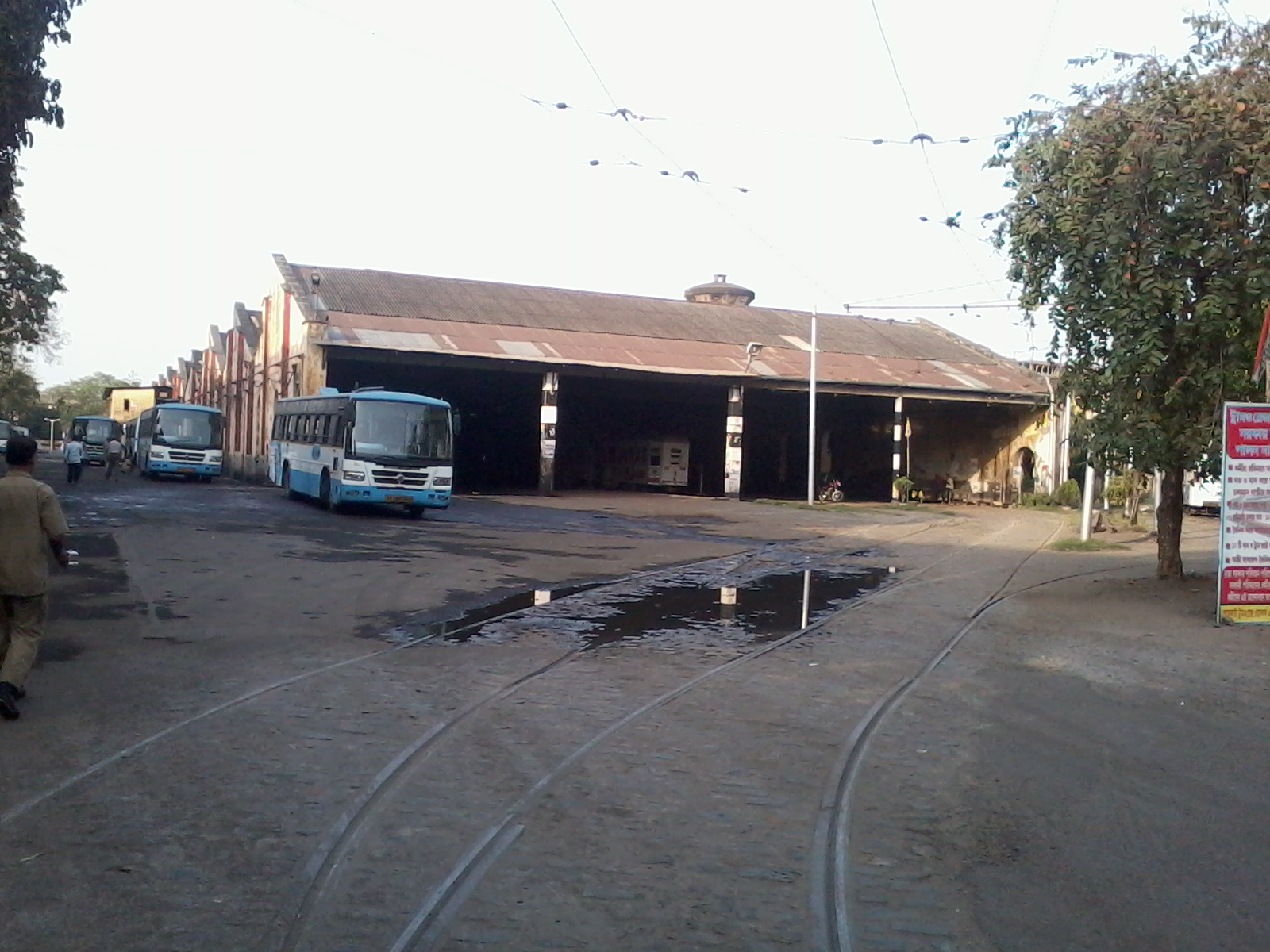
Belgachia Tram Depot

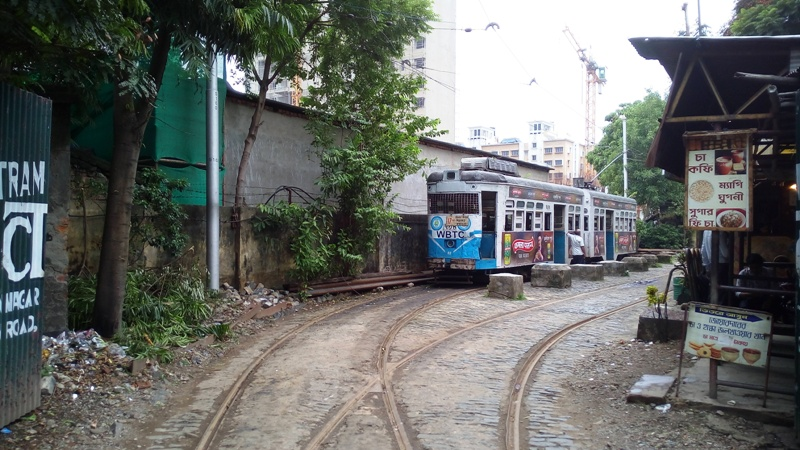
Bidhannagar Tram Terminus is the easternmost terminus of Kolkata's tram network

After the starting of the line 2 of Kolkata metro in 2017, all the BBD Bag bound tram routes have been closed for an indefinite time. Thus tram-plying along Sealdah (Purabi Cinema) Junction-Bowbazar Junction-Lalbazar Junction-BBD Bag, Galiff Street-Shobhabazar Junction-Chitpore Junction-Lalbazar Junction, and Hatibagan Junction-Shobhabazar Junction stretches has been stopped. The Wattgunge junction to Kalighat/Rashbehari Junction stretch has also been closed for an indefinite time since 2018, due to the Majherhat Bridge collapse and thus Tollygunge to Ballygunge Station bound tram route becomes an isolated one. In 2019, it was decided by All India Trinamool Congress government that no any tram service would be continued over any bridge, because tram could reduce the lifespan of bridges. After the decision of mayor Firhad Hakim and transport minister Shubhendu Adhikari, tram service was closed on Belgachia Bridge, Shyambazar Bridge, Maniktala Bridge, Kalighat Bridge & Sealdah flyover. The tram trackbed renewal program became unfinished on Belgachia Bridge and Sealdah flyover, and starting of tram track uprooting started on those bridges. Belgachia tram depot also has been converted to bus depot, despite the track renewal program inside the depot was just completed two months earlier, and thus tram-plying along Maniktala Junction-Shyambazar Junction-Belgachia and Shyambazar Tram Terminus-Shyambazar Junction stretches was closed in 2018. In 2019, first A.C. tram route (AC-1) of Kolkata starts which runs between Esplanade and Shyambazar. The state government decided to stop tram-plying on the 37 years old Sealdah Flyover (Vidyapati Setu), after the survey of the bridge-advisory committee officers in 2019 and thus tram-plying along the Surya Sen Street-Nonapukur, Purabi Cinema-Sealdah and Moulali-Subodh Chandra Mallik Square stretches has also been stopped. State Government also decided to shut down tram-plying on Belgachia Bridge permanently due to the excessive load on the bridge. In December 2023, the mayor Firhad Hakim stated his intention to close down all the tram routes in the city except Route 36, which would be run as a truncated heritage line till Racecourse. Work comemenced September 2024, but was halted after a Calcutta High Court ruling on 14 January 2025.

==== Timeline ====
- 1992 – Esplanade – Planetarium route reclosed (Route 12A). Bus service introduced.
- 1994 – Howrah Station terminus closed and converted to public bus terminus. Route 11, 20 & 26 had come back to Howrah Bridge terminus. Metcalfe Hall – Howrah Bridge terminus closed (Route 15, 21, 30 & 32 diversion). Bidhannagar new terminus opened.
- 1995 – Dalhousie Square – Metcalfe Hall – High Court route closed. Route 14 had come back to BBD Bag terminus.
- 1998 – Gariahat Depot – Gariahat Junction route closed (Route 25 & 26 starts from Gariahat Depot).
- 2002 – Mominpore – Behala route closed (Route 27, 35 & 37).
- 2004 – Shyambazar Junction – Galiff Street route closed (Route 12 & 13 had come back to Rajabazar).
- 2008 – Dalhousie Square terminus redesigned for underground car parking.
- 2011 – Behala – Joka route closed for construction of Purple line Metro.
- 2012 – Bagbazar terminus closed, Bagbazar – Galiff Street section doubled (Route 8 had extended to Galiff Street).
- 2019 – Maniktala – Shyambazar – Belgachia route closed. Belgachia depot only operates buses (Route 11 starts from Shyambazar terminus). Surya Sen Street – Sealdah – Moula Ali – Nonapukur route closed (Route 12, 17, 20 & 26). Wellington Square – Moula Ali route closed (Route 12 & 17).
- 2020 – Kalighat – Wattgunge closed (Route 24, 29 & 30). Rajabazar – Maniktala – Bidhannagar closed (Route 16, 17 & 18). Kidderpore – Esplanade closed (Route 36).
- 2024 – Tollygunge – Ballygunge suspended (Route 24/29).

=== 2026–present: Proposed revival, modernisation and expansion ===
Following several years of uncertainty over the future of Kolkata's tram system, the newly elected Government of West Bengal announced a policy shift in mid-2026 aimed at reviving, modernising and selectively expanding the city's historic tram network. The proposals marked the first official commitment in decades to both restore tram services and investigate the construction of new tram corridors, reversing the long-term trend of network contraction.

In June 2026, the state government announced plans to procure lightweight, modern tramcars from international manufacturers as part of a comprehensive revival programme. Unlike the existing fleet, the proposed vehicles are expected to feature contemporary low-floor designs, air conditioning, improved accessibility, and modern passenger amenities. The government also indicated that alternative propulsion technologies, including battery-powered operation, would be examined to reduce the need for conventional overhead electrification on future routes.

To prepare a long-term development strategy, the government appointed RITES Limited to undertake a technical survey of Kolkata's tram infrastructure. The study is intended to evaluate the feasibility of restoring suspended corridors, upgrading existing infrastructure, and identifying new alignments that could accommodate modern tram operations while minimising interference with road traffic. The survey is also expected to recommend a phased implementation plan for network expansion.

Among the proposals announced was a new tram corridor linking the Dakshineswar Kali Temple in northern Kolkata with the Kalighat Kali Temple in the south. The project is intended to improve connectivity between two of the city's most significant religious and cultural landmarks while promoting heritage tourism and sustainable urban transport. Transport Minister Arjun Singh stated that the route would form part of a broader effort to integrate tram services with Kolkata's tourism and public transport infrastructure. The government also indicated that additional new routes were being considered, including extensions towards Salt Lake and New Town, areas that have experienced substantial urban growth but have never been served by the tram network. These proposals would represent the first major geographic expansion of Kolkata's tramway since the extension to Joka in 1986.

The revival proposals further include the reintroduction of air-conditioned tramcars, which had previously operated on a limited basis after their introduction in 2013. Officials stated that future tram services would aim to combine heritage preservation with modern public transport requirements, rather than functioning solely as tourist attractions. As of July 2026, the revival programme is in process. Technical surveys had been commissioned, but detailed project reports, funding approvals, implementation schedules, and construction timelines had not yet been publicly released. Regular tram operations continues on a limited number of routes while the proposed modernisation and expansion plans awaites further governmental approval and implementation.

== Infrastructure ==
=== Rolling stock ===
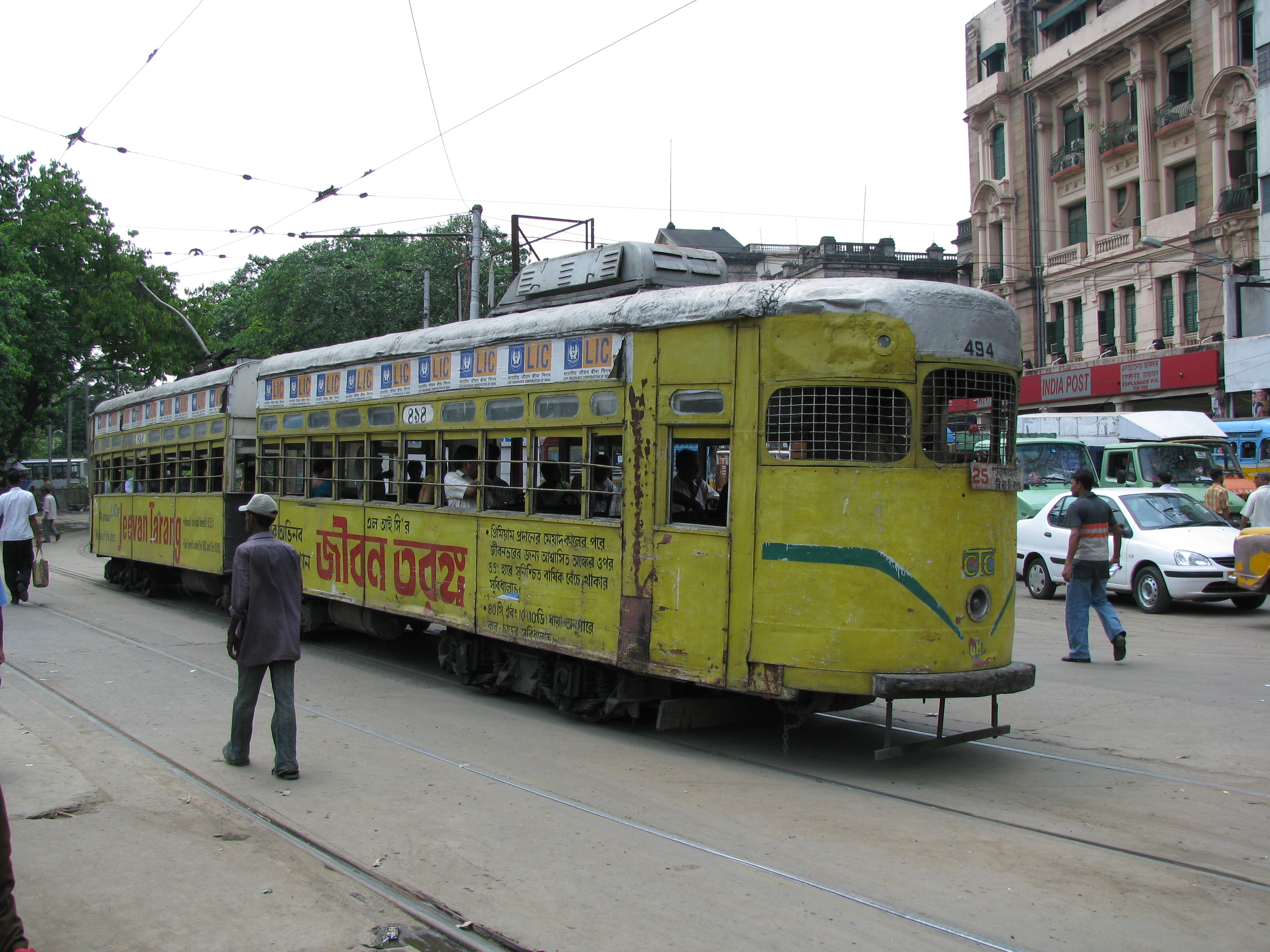
SLC tram in 2009

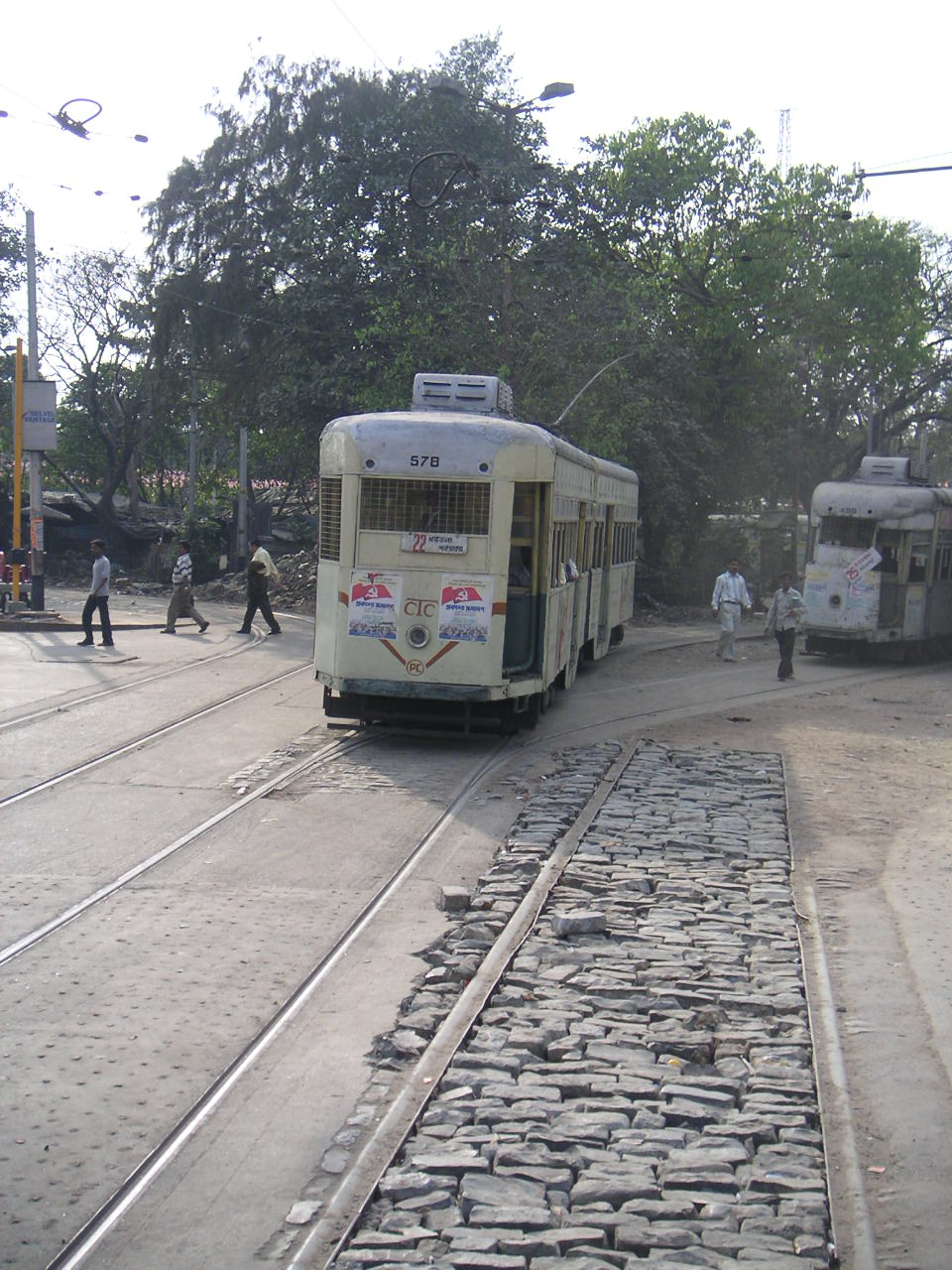
Articulated tram

CTC owns 257 trams (as of Sep. 2024), of which 125 used to run daily till 2011. Each single-deck articulated car can carry 200 passengers (60 seated). But the number of trams sharply decreased due to government's negligence and now only 20 trams run daily (as of June 2026).

The early horse-drawn cars and steel cars manufactured before 1952 were imported from England. Early trams were single-coach, similar to those in Delhi, Mumbai, Chennai and Kanpur. The later stock was the SLT type: double-coach with three doors, four wheels under each coach and no wheels between coaches. SLT trams had no front iron net but had a front-coach trolley pole. The both-end type had a front iron net and a rear-coach trolley pole. These were gradually replaced by articulated trams on all routes. The SLC type was introduced much later on the Bandhaghat line, and continued until its closure in 1971; after that, SLC trams began running on the Gariahat and Tollygunge lines on the Kolkata side.

Two trams were recently renovated with front and back glass, fluorescent lights, FM radio, digital display boards, angled seats, and a fibreglass ceiling. The Nonapukur workshop began manufacturing 19 new trams from 2008 to 2010, of which four were nearing completion. The roof is clear polycarbonate sheeting with a wide window, and it has comfortable seating and better visibility from within. The workshop is also renovating steel-body (BSCL) cars. With plans for banquet-cafeteria and air-conditioned trams to attract commuters and foreign tourists (increasing CTC revenue), a single-coach, air-conditioned banquet tram has been introduced for heritage tours of North Kolkata in the morning and South Kolkata in the evening. Although the air-conditioned tram had poor ridership when it was introduced, more air-conditioned trams have since been introduced. These include a tram restaurant (Victoria) and the world's first shopping (glam) tram and library tram.

==== Rolling stock classification ====
- Horse Trams – The service was started with this class in 1873. Horse drawn cars were withdrawn gradually after electrification of the network from 1902.

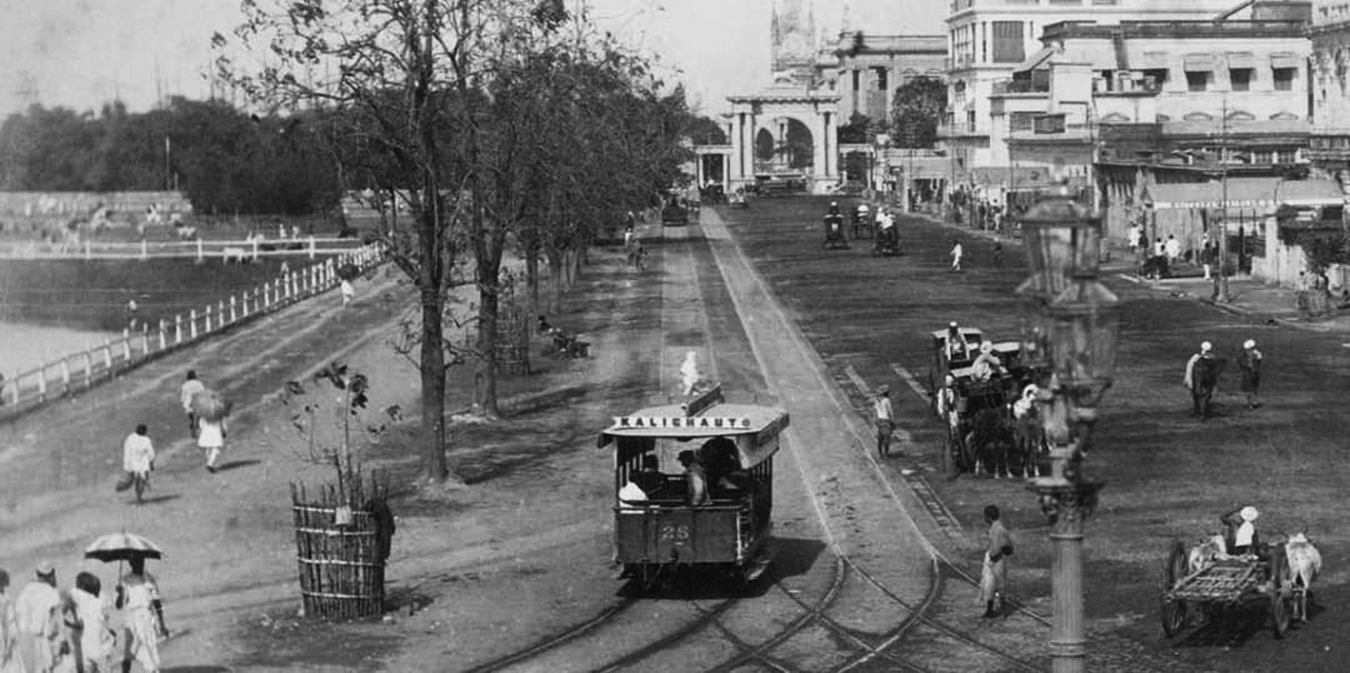
Horse Tram in Calcutta

- Steam Trams – Steam propelled trams were introduced as a substitute to horse-drawn trams and withdrawn within a very short period after electrification of the system.
- J Class Trams – The J Class trams were 4 Axled Single Car Trams numbered from 301–306.
- K Class Trams – The K Class trams (often called the English Cars) were articulated 6 axled wooden trams manufactured from 1931–39. These trams were numbered from 307–489.
- L Class Trams – The L Class trams (often affectionately called the Hatigari or Elephant Car) were Streamlined articulated trams manufactured from 1942–51 at the Nonapukur Workshop. These trams were numbered from 490–559. The L class trams were one of the most iconic types of trams to have ever ran on Kolkata's streets, it had extra overhand both at its front and rear.
- PAYE Trams – After the closure of the Bombay (now Mumbai) tramways in 1964, CTC obtained 45 sets of maximum-traction trucks and controllers from Bombay Electricity Supply and Transport Undertaking (BEST). These running units were used in a class of six experimental Pay As You Enter (PAYE) trams. The prototype (201) was built in 1965, and 202–203 followed in 1966, with 204–206 being added in 1967. In about 1970 the PAYE system was dropped and the trams were modified to conventional layout with roving rather than seated conductors, and the entrances at the ends of the trams were sealed.
- Sundari Trams – Sundari trams were wooden articulated trams similar to the K Class built in 1976–77. These trams were numbered from 561–587. The chief difference was that these trams were fitted out as double first-class cars. This feature also won the trams their alternative title of "De Luxe" trams. The double headlamps gave way to a single unit but, on the other hand, the blue and white livery was adorned with black and white flashes on the dash, and black and white chevrons on the fenders and trolley poles, and a glass windscreen.

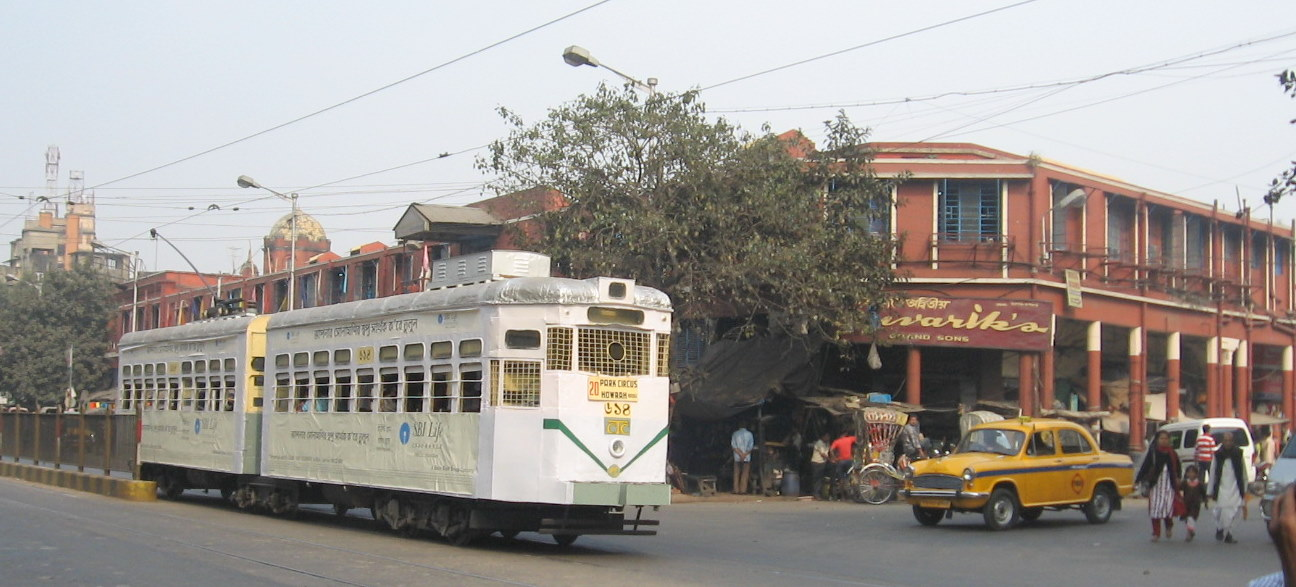
A Burn Standard Tramcar

- Burn Standard Trams – After many years of SLC and articulated trams, rolling stock arrived from Burn Standard India which is stronger, heavier and faster than earlier designs and reversed the declining public perception of trams in the city. The improved stock began running throughout the city on all routes. The Burn standard Trams were delivered from 1982–89 and were numbered from A-207 to 281, B-291 to 299, C-600 to 659 and D-701 to 725.
- Jessop Trams – The Jessop & Company made trams were sleeker than the Burn standard in design and were delivered from 1988–89 and were numbered from 681–700. This was the last original fleet added to the system other than refurbished cars. Some of them were modified with front glass; some were modified to resemble Melbourne's B-class trams with fluorescent lights, back glass and double ends.

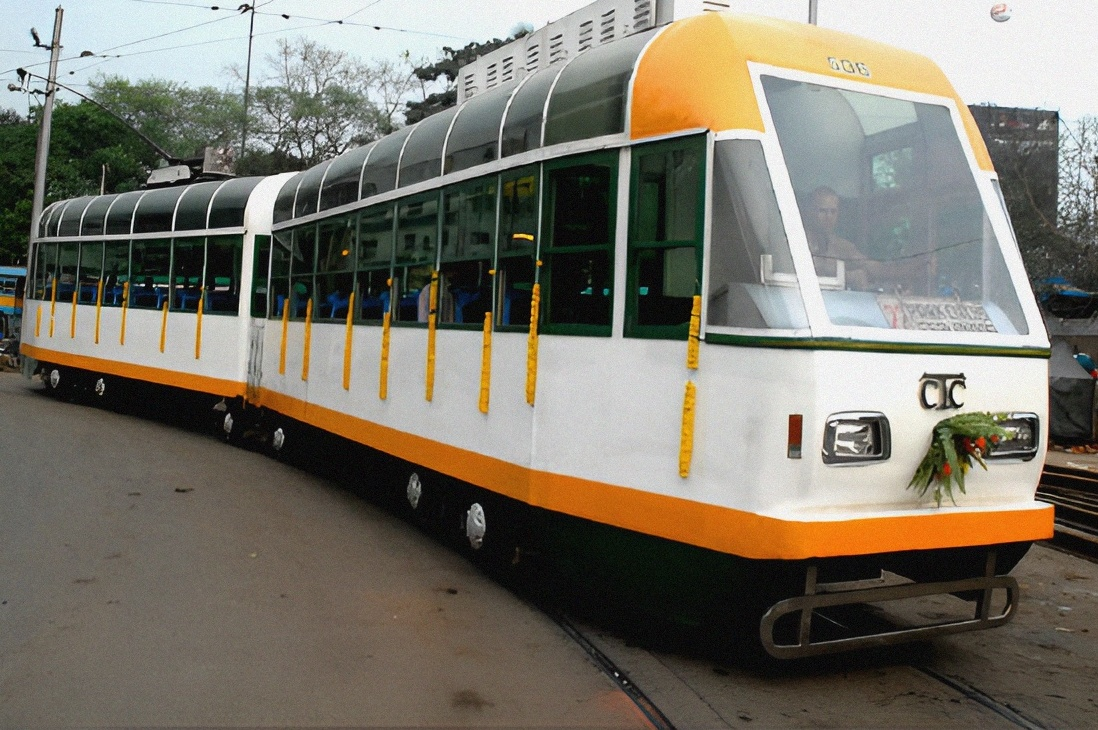
New fibreglass made tram

- Fibre Body Trams – Before the introduction of the single-coach tram in December 2012, this was the last new rolling stock. Refurbished in the Nonapukur Workshop, various L Class, Burn standard and Jessop trams were completely torn down and refurbished from scratch. Some were modified with front glass; one was modified with fluorescent lights, FM radio, digital advertising and route boards. These refurbished cars were built from 2008–11.
- Single-car Trams (New) – Introduced on 24 December 2012, they were reportedly faster and more manoeuvrable than double-coach trams; the carriage is longer than those in double-coach trams. In 2019, 8 Non AC and 8 AC Single car Trams were manufactured, More single-coach trams were planned across the city (including air-conditioned coaches), possibly replacing double-coach trams and enabling some closed routes to reopen.

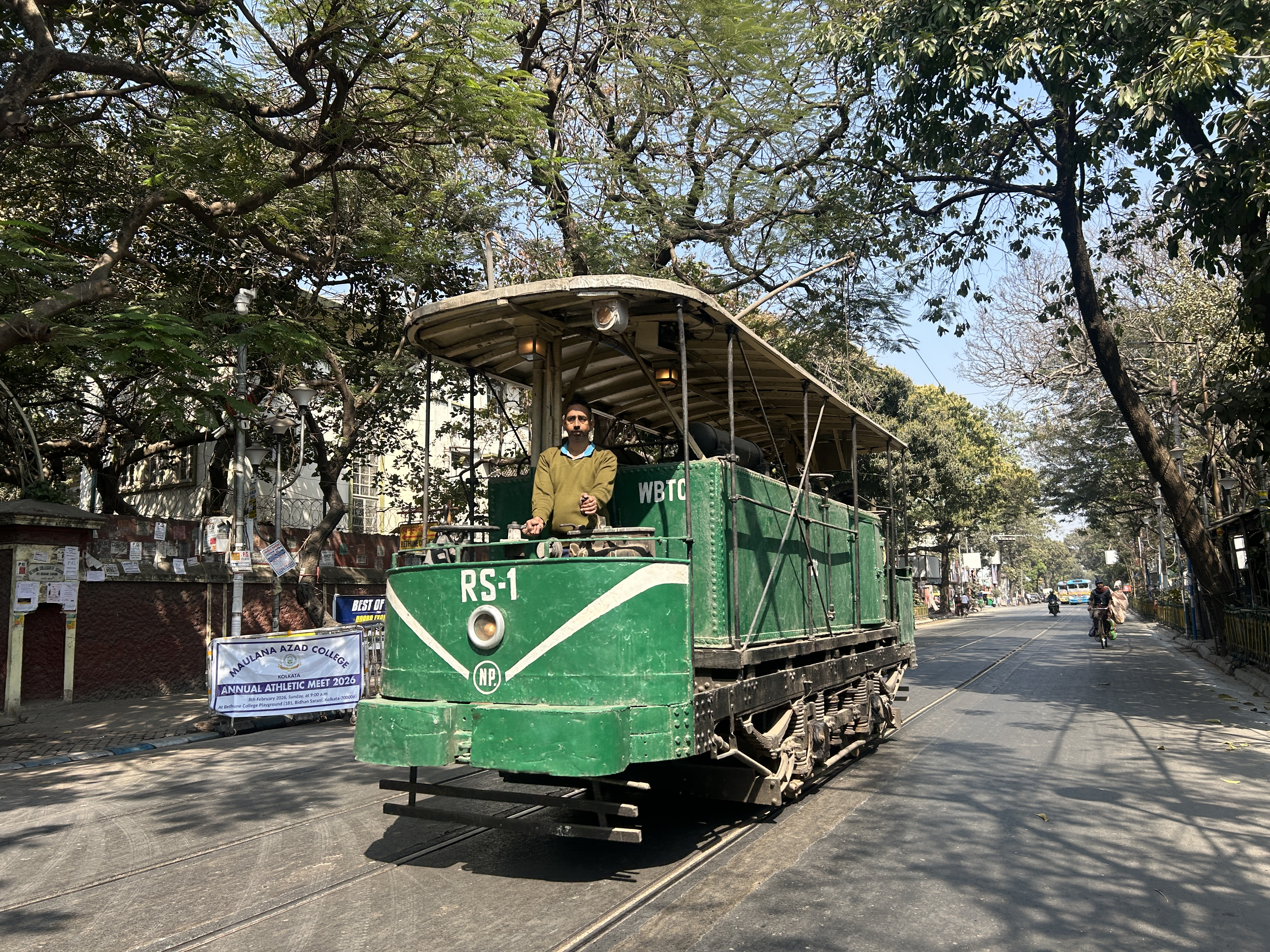
The Rail Scrubber 1 (RS-1) is the oldest tram car in Kolkata, manufactured in 1918

- Work Trams – Work Tramcars in Kolkata are a fleet of Tramcars that are not used for carrying passengers. Instead, used by the CTC for maintenance, repairs, inspections, and other operational works. The current fleet: Rail Scrubber 1 (RS1), Rail Scrubber 3 (RS3), Howrah Watering Car (HWC), Inspection Wagon 2 (IW2), Flat Wagon 2 (FW2), Flat Wagon 3 (FW3), Traffic Watering Car (TWC), Staff Car 1 (SC1), Staff Car 2 (SC2).
- Special Trams – Tramcars that possess unique historical, technological, cultural, or functional characteristics beyond regular passenger services, making them distinct from the standard operational fleet. There are quite a few Special Tramcars usually stabled at the Nonapukur Workshop, and can be hired by anyone. The Special Tramcar fleet list: Gitanjali, Balaka, Bonolota, Bioscope, Sunrise Tram, Art Gallery Tram, Smaranika Tram Museum, Maa Sharoda, Victoria Tram.

=== Power supply ===
The trams have a 550V DC power supply from overhead lines. Power was obtained from a trolley pole, a current collector mounted on top of the tram. The track rails were the return path for the current. DC power was supplied by mercury-arc rectifier (converter) stations, located throughout the city.

=== Tram Workshop ===
Kolkata Tram system has a central workshop at Nonapukur, Kolkata, referred to as Nonapukur Workshop (NP), which makes tram components and assemble, repair, service, refurbish trams. The workshop can also produce brand new trams.

=== Tram Depots ===
- Kalighat (KG) – 1881 to 2019 = 138 years, now idle. (Route 30, 31, 24/30, 30/36)
- Kidderpore (KP) – 1883 to 2020 = 137 years, now operating buses. (Route 36, 29/36, 30/36)
- Belgachia (BL) – 1903 to 2019 = 116 years, now operating buses. (Route 1, 2, 3, 4, 11)
- Tollygunge (TG) – 1903 to 2024 = 121 years, now operating buses. (Route 29, 32, 29/36, 24/29)
- Ghasbagan (GB) – 1908 to 1971 = 63 years, now operating buses. (Route 41, 42)
- Rajabazar (RB) – 1910 to 2021 = 110 years, now operating buses. (Route 12, 14)
- Park Circus (PC) – 1925 to 2016 = 91 years, now operating buses. (Route 20, 21, 22)
- Gariahat (GH) – 1943 to still running, also an electric bus depot. (Route 25)

=== Tram Terminus ===
- BBD Bag – 1881 to 2017 = 136 years, Temporarily Suspended. (Route 2, 4, 6, 8, 10, 13, 14, 16, 22, 24, 25, 29, 30)
- Sealdah Station – 1881 to 1981 = 100 years, now a parking lot. (Route 14)
- Esplanade – 1881 to present, Active tram & bus terminus. (Route 5, 25)
- High Court – 1882 to 1995 = 91 years, now annex building of high court. (Route 14, 15)
- Nimtala – 1882 to 1973 = 91 years, now a street. (Route 19)
- Shyambazar – 1903 to present, Active tram terminus. (Route 5)
- Bagbazar – 1904 to 2012 = 108 years, now a godown. (Route 7, 8)
- Galiff Street – 1908 to 2017 = 109 years, now Temporarily Suspended. (Route 8, 12, 13, 50, 12/7)
- Howrah Station – 1908 to 1994 = 86 years, now a bus terminus. (Route 11, 12A, 18, 20, 21, 26, 28, 30, 32, 40, 41, 42)
- Bandhaghat – 1908 to 1971 = 63 years, now a street. (Route 41, 42)
- Shibpore – 1908 to 1971 = 63 years, now a street. (Route 40)
- Behala – 1908 to 2011 = 103 years, now a street. (Route 27, 35)
- Racecourse – 1927 to 1976 = 49 years, now a street.
- Ballygunge – 1928 to 2024 = 96 years, now Temporarily Suspended. (Route 24, 25, 26, 27, 24/29)
- Planetarium – 1979 to 1992 = 13 years, now a park. (Route 12A)
- Bidhannagar – 1985 to 2020 = 35 years, now Temporarily Suspended. (Route 16, 17, 18)
- Joka (JK) – 1986 to 2011 = 25 years, now a bus Depot. (Route 37)

== Routes ==
=== Active Routes ===
Route No.	Formerly ran as	Currently running as	Route	Distance
5	Shyambazar – Esplanade		Darpan Cinema, Town School, Hatibagan, Rupbani Cinema, Khudiram College, Scottish College, Hedua Park, Vivekananda Road, Sreemani Bazar, Vidyasagar College, Thanthania Kalibari, Bata More, College Street, Presidency College, Calcutta University, Calcutta Medical College, Bowbazar, Hind Cinema, Wellington Crossing, Janbazar, Chandni Chowk	5 km
25	Ballygunge – B. B. D. Bagh	Gariahat – Esplanade	Ballygunge Phari, Birla Mandir, Gurusaday Road, Ice Skating Rink, Beck Bagan, Zeeshan, Park Circus 7 Point, Jannagar Road, Mullick Bazar, Nonapukur, Elliot Road, Royd Street, Bata, Ripon Street, Gol Talab, Muslim Institute, Maulana Azad College, Wellington Crossing, Janbazar, Chandni Chowk	9 km

=== Defunct / Temporarily Suspended Routes ===
Route No.	Formerly run as	Last run as	Destination via
1	Belgachia – Esplanade		College Street
1/11	Belgachia – Howrah Station		Acharya Praphulla Chandra Roy Road
1/12	Belgachia – Esplanade		Acharya Praphulla Chandra Roy Road
1/13	Belgachia – B. B. D. Bagh		Esplanade
1/17	Belgachia – Bidhannagar		
1/20	Belgachia – Park Circus		Acharya Praphulla Chandra Roy Road
1/37	Belgachia – Joka		
2	Belgachia – B. B. D. Bagh		College Street
2/13	Belgachia – B. B. D. Bagh		Acharya Praphulla Chandra Roy Road
3	Belgachia – Esplanade		Rabindra Sarani
4	Belgachia – B. B. D. Bagh		Rabindra Sarani
6	Shyambazar – B. B. D. Bagh		College Street
7	Bagbazar – Esplanade		
8	Bagbazar – B. B. D. Bagh	Galiff Street – B. B. D. Bagh	
8/36	Bagbazar – Kidderpore		
9	Shyambazar – Esplanade		Rabindra Sarani
10	Shyambazar – B. B. D. Bagh		Rabindra Sarani
11	Belgachia – Howrah Station	Shyambazar – Howrah Bridge	College Street
12	Galiff Street – Howrah Station	Rajabazar – Esplanade	Esplanade
12A	Birla Planetarium – Howrah Station		
12B	Rajabazar – Howrah Station		Esplanade, B. B. D. Bagh
12/7	Galiff Street – Esplanade		B. B. D. Bagh
12/20	Galiff Street – Park Circus		
12/26	Galiff Street – Ballygunge		
12/32	Rajabazar – Howrah Station		Esplanade, Bentinck Street
12A/32	Planetarium – Howrah Station		Esplanade, Bentinck Street
12/36	Rajabazar – Kidderpore		
13	Galiff Street – Howrah Station	Galiff Street – B. B. D. Bagh	Bepin Bihari Ganguly Street
14	Rajabazar – High Court	Rajabazar – B. B. D. Bagh	
15	Esplanade – High Court		Sealdah, Rajiv Gandhi Sarani
15/20	High Court – Howrah Station		Sealdah
16	Bidhannagar Road – B. B. D. Bagh		
17	Bidhannagar Road – Esplanade		
17/20	Bidhannagar – Park Circus		
17/26	Bidhannagar – Ballygunge		
18	Bidhannagar Road – Howrah Bridge		
19	Nimtala – Esplanade		
19/15	Nimtala – High Court		
20	Park Circus – Howrah Station	Park Circus – Howrah Bridge	Sealdah
21	Park Circus – Howrah Station	Park Circus – Howrah Bridge	Esplanade
22	Park Circus – B. B. D. Bagh		
24	Ballygunge – B. B. D. Bagh	Ballygunge – Esplanade	Kalighat
24/29	Tollygunge – Ballygunge		
24/30	Ballygunge – Kalighat		
24/37	Ballygunge – Joka		
26	Ballygunge – Howrah Station	Gariahat – Howrah Bridge	Sealdah
27	Behala – Ballygunge		
29	Tollygunge – B. B. D. Bagh	Tollygunge – Esplanade	
29/37	Tollygunge – Joka		
30	Kalighat – Howrah Station	Kalighat – Howrah Bridge	Jawahar Lal Nehru Road
30/36	Kalighat – Kidderpore		
31	Kalighat – Esplanade		Mominpore
32	Tollygunge – Howrah Station	Tollygunge – Howrah Bridge	Rajiv Gandhi Sarani
35	Behala – B. B. D. Bagh	Behala – Esplanade	
35A	Behala – Howrah Station		
36	Kidderpore – Esplanade		
36/24	Kidderpore – Ballygunge		
36/29	Kidderpore – Tollygunge		
37	Joka – B. B. D. Bagh	Joka – Esplanade	
37/35	Joka – Behala		
40	Howrah Station – Shibpore		
41	Howrah Station – Bandhaghat		Grand Trunk Road
42	Howrah Station – Bandhaghat		Salkia School Road
50	Galiff Street – Tollygunge		Sealdah, Gariahat

== Cultural significance ==
=== Advocacy and awareness ===
Calcutta Tram Users Association (CTUA) is an apolitical organization created in December 2016 and registered under the Society Act, formed by tramway users and advocating for the tramways of Kolkata since 2016.

=== Smaranika tram museum ===
The Smaranika Tram Museum is a heritage Tramways museum located within the Esplanade Tram Terminus in central Kolkata. Established in 2014, the museum is housed inside a restored 1945 L Class wooden-bodied tramcar (Staff Car 5), making it one of the few museums in the world located inside an original historic tram. It was conceived to preserve the history and cultural legacy of Kolkata's tramways, the oldest operating electric tram system in Asia and the only surviving tram network in India.

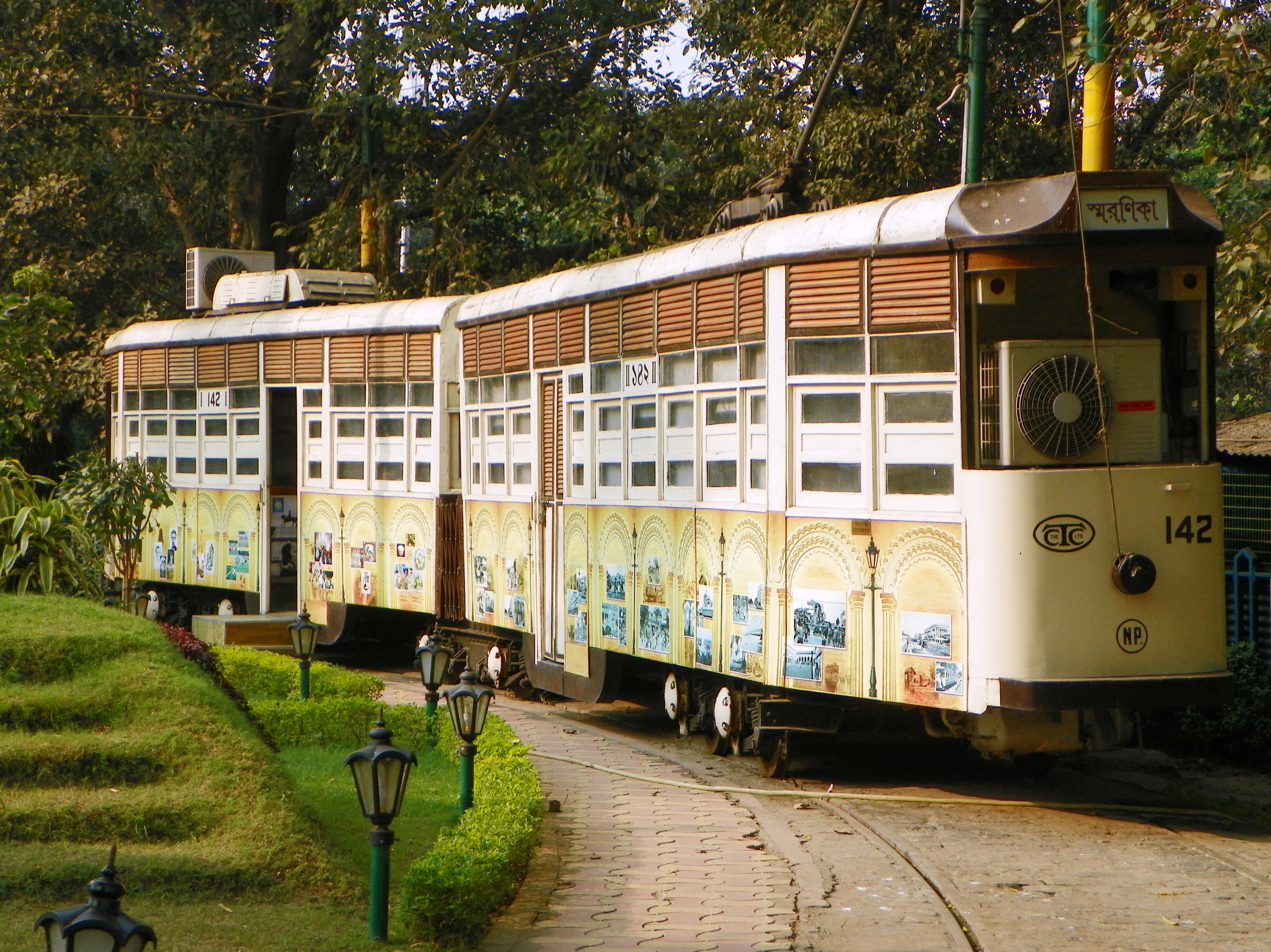
Smaranika Tram Museum at the Esplanade Tram Terminus

The museum combines historical exhibits with a small café, offering visitors an immersive experience within an authentic heritage tram. Rather than constructing a conventional museum building, the creators chose to preserve a retired tramcar as the exhibition space itself, reinforcing the close connection between the exhibits and the city's long tramway tradition.

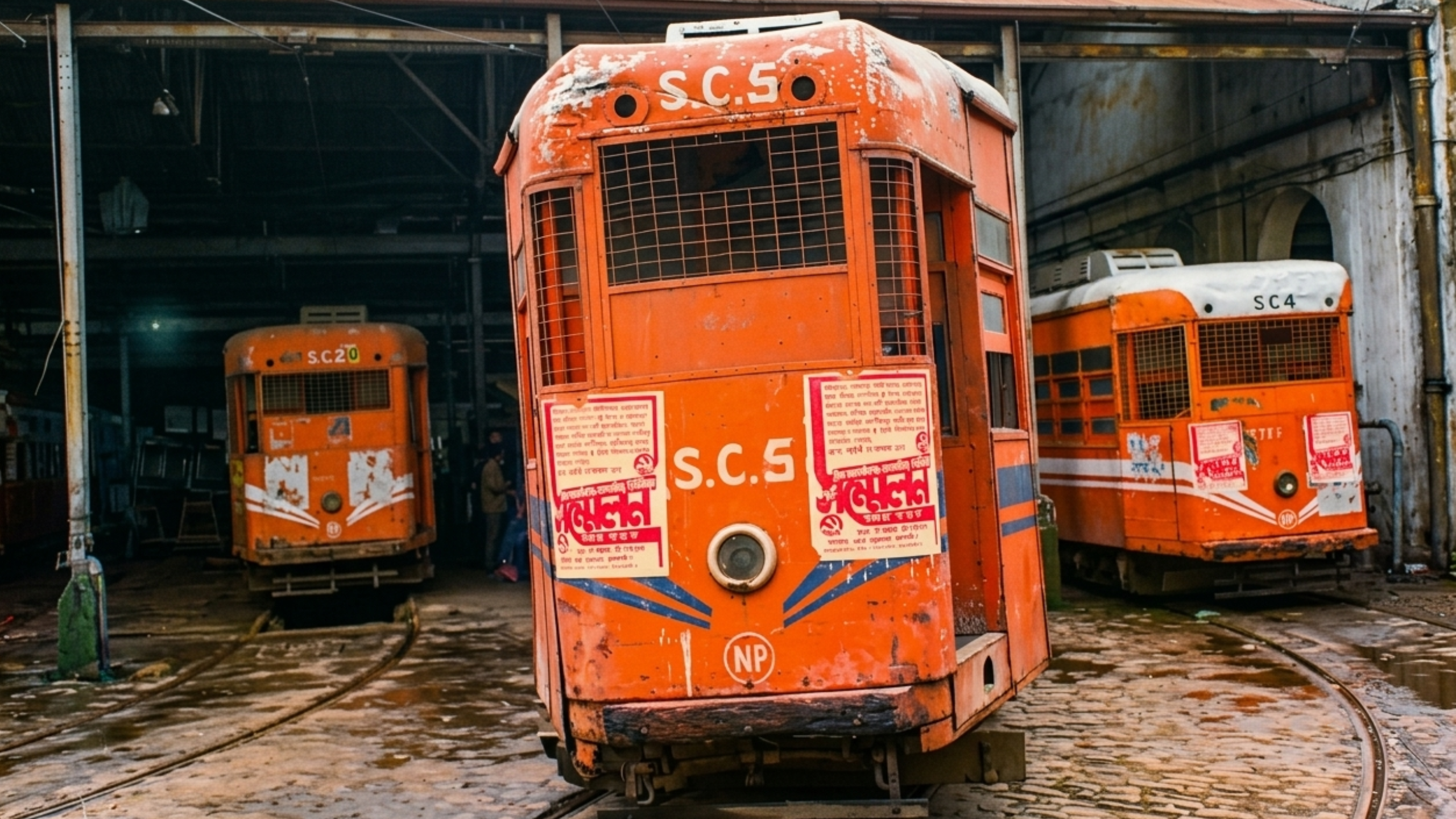
Staff Car 5, the Tram car which is converted to the Smaranika Tram Museum in 2014

The museum was inaugurated in 2014 by the then Calcutta Tramways Company (CTC) during a period when Kolkata's tram network was undergoing significant contraction. The project sought to safeguard more than a century of tramway heritage by conserving photographs, artefacts, documents and equipment that otherwise risked being lost as routes closed and older rolling stock was withdrawn from service.

The museum's name, "Smaranika" (Bengali: স্মরণিকা), translates roughly as "remembrance" or "souvenir," symbolizing its role as a memorial to Kolkata's historic tram system.

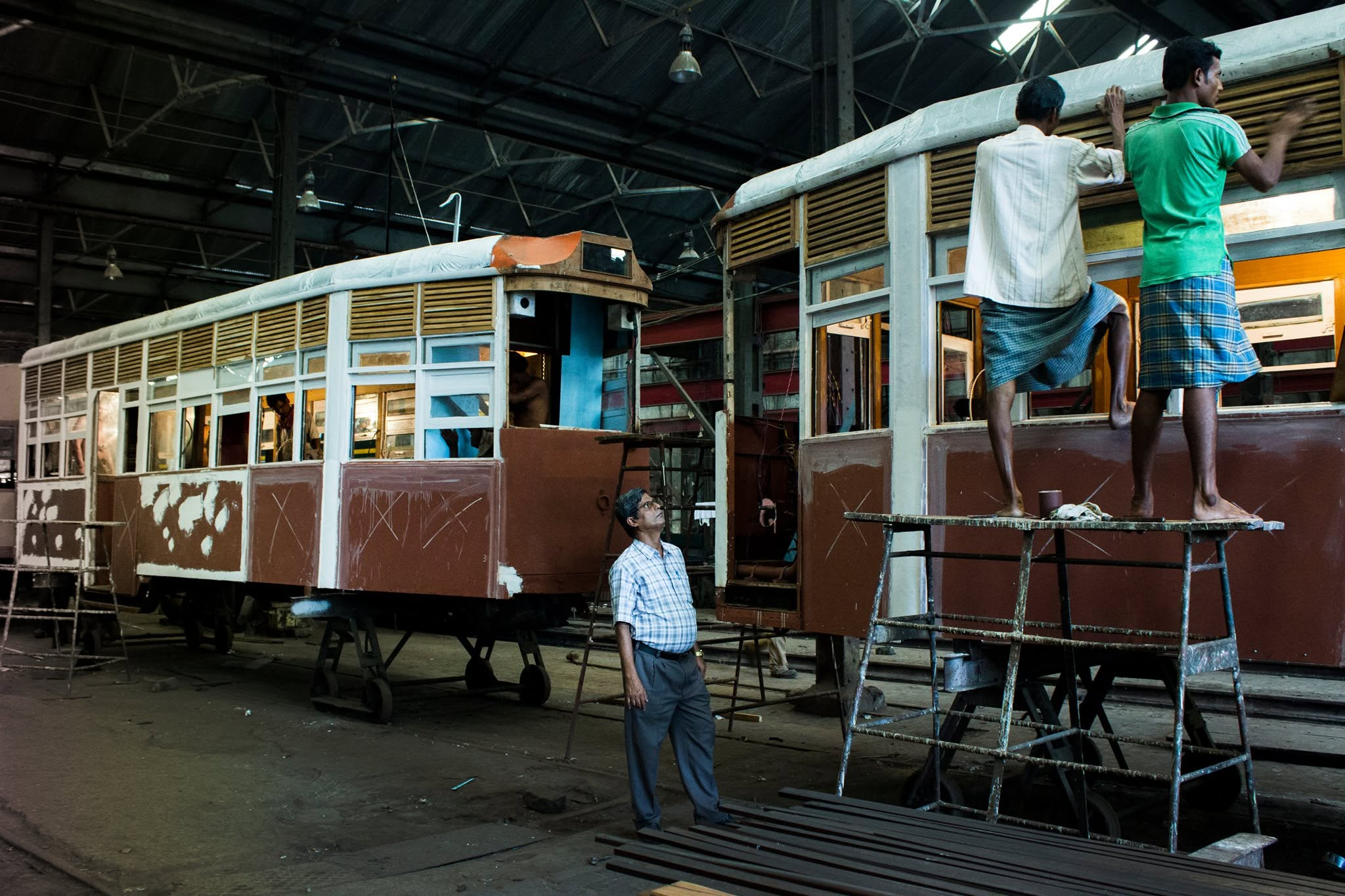
L-class tramcar Staff Car 5 undergoing restoration at the Nonapukur Workshop, where it got converted into the Smaranika Tram Museum.

The tram underwent extensive refurbishment at the Nonapukur Workshop, where its interior was redesigned while retaining much of its original character. The two tramcars were connected with a vestibule, allowing visitors to move seamlessly between the museum gallery and the café. Although permanently parked, the tram remains an authentic heritage vehicle rather than a replica. The restoration retained the tram's distinctive wooden exterior while modernizing the interior for museum use.

A ₹5 Smaranika Tram Museum ticket from 2014

Situated close to several of Kolkata's major landmarks including the Esplanade commercial district, the Maidan, and numerous colonial-era buildings the museum has become a popular stop for heritage tourists, railway enthusiasts and photographers. Visitors often combine a visit to Smaranika with a ride on one of the city's remaining operational tram routes, providing both historical and contemporary perspectives on Kolkata's tram system.

=== Tram café ===
One section of the tram has been converted of the tram has been converted allowing visitors to enjoy refreshments while remaining inside the restored vehicle. The café preserves much of the tram's historic ambience and contributes o the museum's interactive character. Rather than functioning solely as an exhibition space, Smaranika encourages visitors to spend time within the tram, recreating, to some extent, the atmosphere of travelling aboard one of Kolkata's iconic streetcars.

=== In popular culture ===
Several movies have been shot on the Kolkata tram network and in its depots:

- Howrah Bridge
- Bari theke Paliye
- Kathin Maya
- The World of Apu
- Mahanagar
- Interview
- Baharen Phir Bhi Aayengi
- City of Joy
- Kichhu Sanglap Kichhu Pralap
- Char Adhyay
- Calcutta Mail
- Hey Ram
- Yuva
- The Namesake
- Parineeta
- Jay Jay
- Sukno Lanka
- Kahaani
- Barfi
- Special 26
- Open Tee Bioscope
- Praktan
- Piku
- Bullet Raja
- Parineeta
- Detective Byomkesh Bakshy
- Meri Pyaari Bindu
- Kuchh Bheege Alfaaz
- Raavan
- Kushi
- Natasaarvabhowma
- Chaalchitra
- Chaalchitra Ekhon
- Oti Uttam
- Metro... In Dino

== Accidents ==
1. On 14 October 1954, Bengali poet Jibanananda Das got hit by a tramcar. He died eight days after; as a result of being involved in that accident. Witnesses had later recounted that the tramcar had blown its whistle, but Das did not stop, and got struck. Some have also speculated the accident was suicide.
2. On 3 December 2012, a seven-year-old was killed by a tram entering the Bidhannagar depot. The boy was reportedly playing near the tracks when the tram approached and it struck him, before the brakes could be fully applied.
3. A bus driver attempted to overtake a tram on 31 January 2013. The rear of the bus grazed the tram, amputating a bus passenger's arm. The man was rushed to the hospital for his arm to be reattached.
4. On 19 June 2014, a driverless tram struck 10 cars. No fatalities or injuries were reported.

== See also ==
- Trams in India
- Kolkata Metro
- Kolkata Suburban Railway
- Kolkata Circular Railway
- List of tram and light rail transit systems
