= Jessop & Company =

Indian engineering company

- Type: private
- Industry: Heavy Engineering & Infrastructure
- Founded: 1788
- Defunct: 2013
- Headquarters: Kolkata, India
- Area served: India
- Key people: Pawan K. Ruia, Chairman of Ruia Group
- Products: Railway Wagons, Cranes, Construction Equipment, Engineering-Procurement-Construction (EPC) Services
- Owner: Ruia Group (100%)
- Website: www.jessop.co.in

Jessop & Company Limited was an Indian Government owned engineering company based at Dum Dum, Kolkata, India. It was sold by Government of India to Ruia Group during the Premiership of Atal Bihari Vajpayee. It is part of the Ruia Group of companies, which also owns prominent rubber & tyre companies like Dunlop India and Falcon Tyres.

It was declared as sick and liquidated in 2013 citing fall in productivity and Jessop trade unions had denied accepting productivity-linked wage or halving the number of workers in the factory offered by the Ruia group management to keep the company going.

== History ==
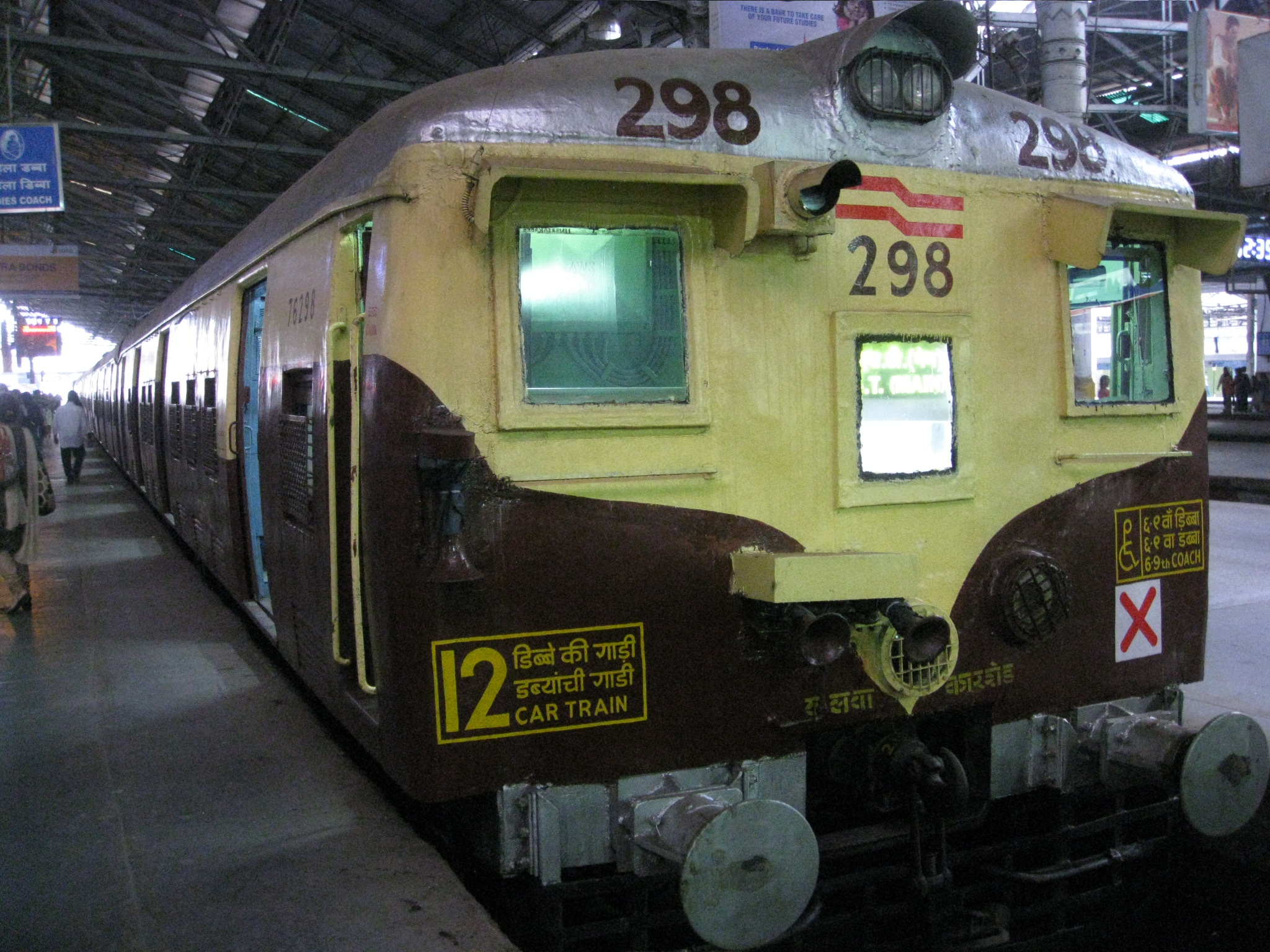
A Jessop-built 1.5 kV DC EMU train built in the 1950s. It was one of the first EMU of Mumbai suburban railway. This design was nicknamed the Lovemate, and was discontinued in 2016

Jessop & Company Limited is India's oldest engineering company, established in 1788.

The history of Jessop & Co. Ltd goes back to year 1788 when Breen & Company was founded in Calcutta. In 1820, Henry and George, sons of William Jessop acquired Breen & Company on behalf of Butterley Company, which was established by William Jessop in Derbyshire. These two companies were merged in 1820 to be renamed as Jessop & Company. The company, during British Raj was a large engineering giant having its head office at 63, Netaji Subhas Road, Kolkata and large manufacturing facilities spread over 63 acres at Dum Dum.

The management of company was taken over by Government of India in 1958 and subsequently in 1973, the company was wholly taken over by the Government of India and Jessop became public sector undertaking. In 1986, with the formation of Bharat Bhari Udyog Nigam (BBUNL), a public sector holding company under administrative control of two government ministries, Department of Heavy Industry and Ministry of Industry, Jessop became a subsidiary of the holding company.

In 2003 the Government of India divested its stake in Jessop & Co. Ltd under privatization programme and sold its 72% stake to Ruia group owned by Pawan Kumar Ruia, who turned it into a profit making entity.

== Achievements ==
Jessop & Co Limited is accredited to have built the first iron bridge in British India over River Gomti, popularly known as Loha-ka-Pul at Lucknow built during year 1815-1840. It was ordered by Nawab of Oudh Jessop's has also built one steam locomotive, delivered to the Nawab of Oudh in the 19th century

The first steam boat to sail on Indian waters made in India was made by Jessop & Co. in 1819. In 1890 it rolled out the first steam road roller for India. It was also one of the pioneers to make heavy duty cranes.

It was part of the team that built Parliament House during year 1921-27 in New Delhi.

In 1930 it formed a partnership company with Braithwaite & Co. Ltd., Burn & Company to form company named Braithwaite, Burn & Jessop Construction Company, for construction of first semi balance cantilever bridge of India, the Howrah Bridge, the construction of which began in 1936 and completed in 1942. The same company Braithwate, Burn & Jessop also won the contract for the construction of Vidyasagar Setu in 1972 completed in 1993, the first cable-stayed bridge in India.

Further, in 1959, it manufactured the first Electrical Multiple Unit coach for Indian Railways. In 1956 it supplied radial gate for Nagarjuna Sagar Dam later on in 1976 it again pioneered for manufacturing Caisson gates for Haldia Dock Project, first time in India.

New cars used by the tram system in Kolkata was delivered by Jessop in 2012.

== Present status ==
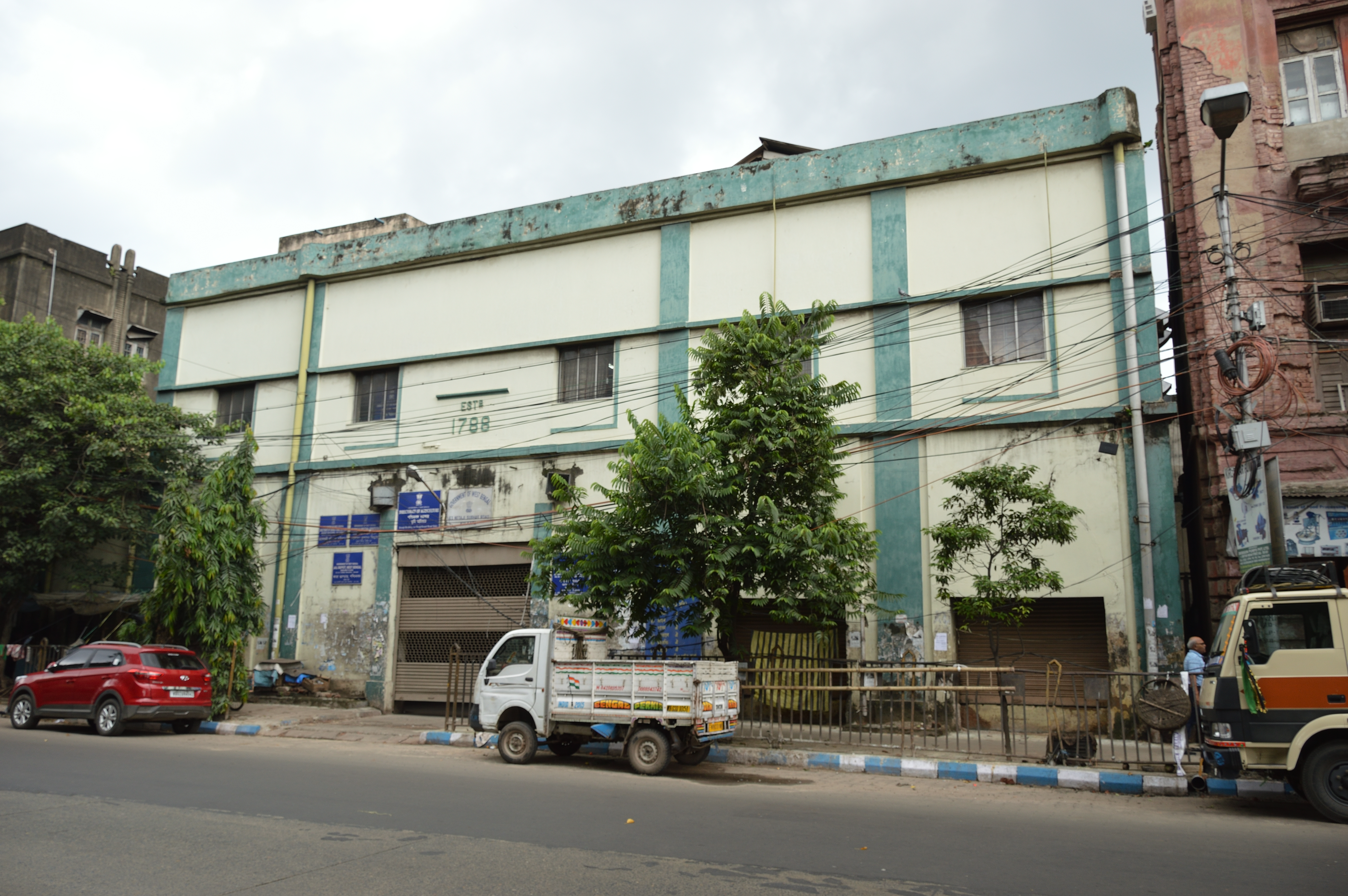
63 Netaji Subhas Road, viewed from Strand Road, Kolkata

The company's net worth eroded over the years and losses mounted into several hundred crores of rupees, as a public sector company. In 2003 the Government of India divested its stake in Jessop & Co. Ltd under the privatisation programme and sold its 72% stake to the Ruia group owned by Pawan Kumar Ruia, who turned it into a profit-making entity. The sale of government share was objected to by staff but the High Court later cleared the deal.

The huge building and company headquarters since 1788 in the heart of the city near B. B. D. Bagh at 63, Netaji Subhas Road was, however, taken over by the Government of West Bengal as the company did not have funds to pay its dues to the state. The company now operates from its works at 1, Jessore Road, Dum Dum, Kolkata.

Today, Jessop manufactures railway coaches and wagons, cranes, road rollers and hydraulic equipment. It is the only company in Asia which has an integrated test facility for testing power roof support and hydraulic items.
