= Vivekananda Setu =

Steel multi-span road cum railway bridge in West Bengal, India

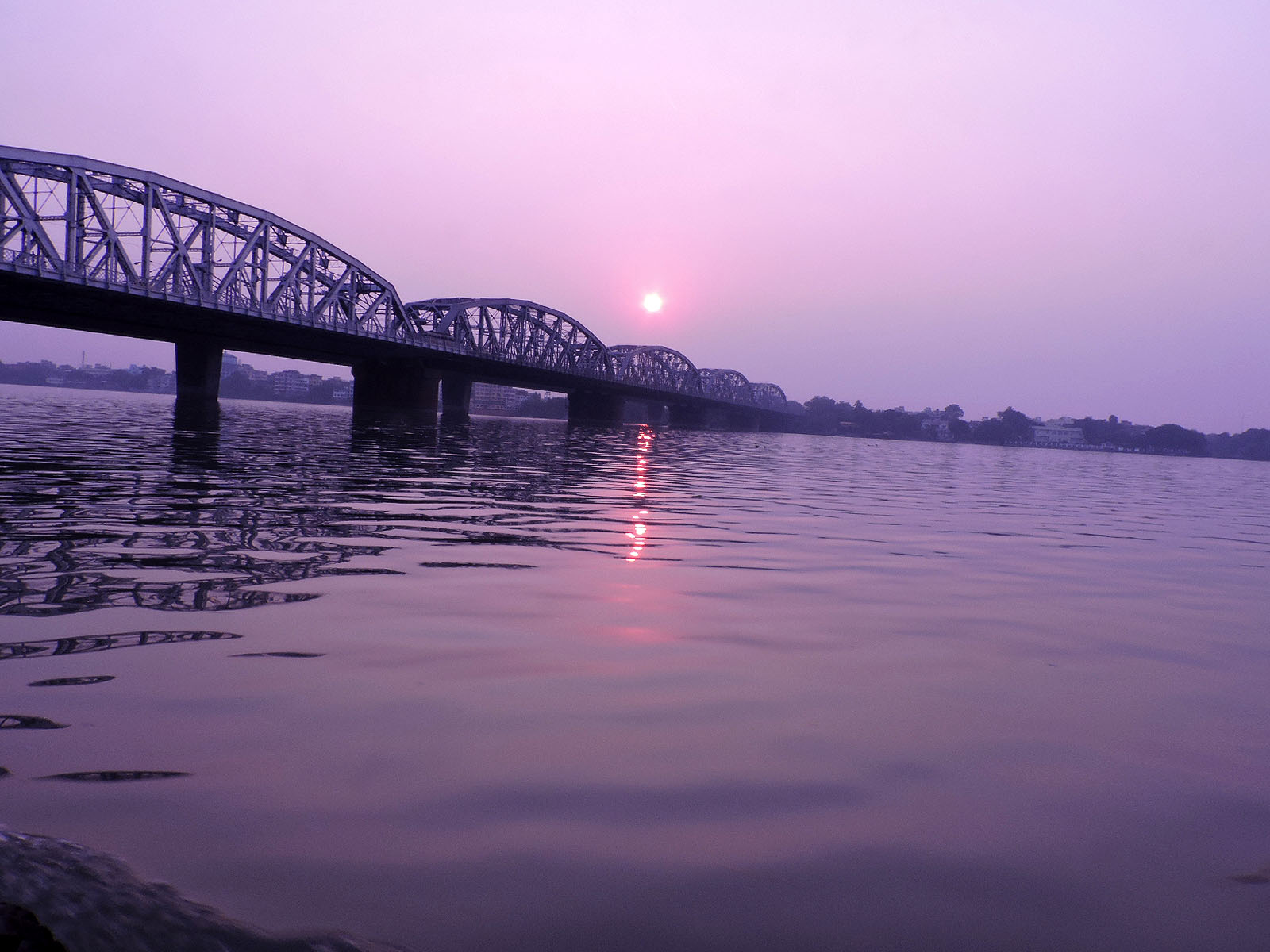
- Vivekananda Setu
- Coordinates: 22°39′11″N 88°21′12″E
- Carries: Rail cum Road bridge
- Crosses: Hooghly River
- Locale: Bally-Dakshineswar
- Official name: Vivekanada Setu

Characteristics
- Material: Steel and Stone
- Total length: 880 metres (2,887 ft)

History
- Construction start: 1926
- Construction end: 1931
- Opened: 29 December 1931; 94 years ago

Location
- Interactive map of Vivekananda Setu

Vivekananda Setu (also called Willingdon Bridge and Bally Bridge) is a bridge over the Hooghly River in West Bengal, India. It links the city of Howrah, at Bally, to Kolkata, at Dakshineswar. Completed in 1931, it is a multispan truss bridge that was built to primarily to provide direct road and rail connectivity between the Calcutta Port and the major railhead at Howrah railway station on the West bank of the Hooghly River. It is 880 metres (2,887 ft) long having 9 spans in total. The famous Dakshineswar Kali Temple is situated on the banks of the Hooghly River near the bridge. The bridge is one of the four bridges linking both sides of Kolkata city. A new road bridge, the Nivedita Setu, was constructed 50 m (160 ft) downstream in 2007 due to weakening of the Vivekanada Setu caused by its ageing.

== Naming ==
The bridge was originally named Willingdon Bridge after Viceroy of India, Freeman Freeman-Thomas, 1st Marquess of Willingdon. It was eventually renamed as Bally Bridge, before officially renamed as Vivekananda Setu.

== Construction ==
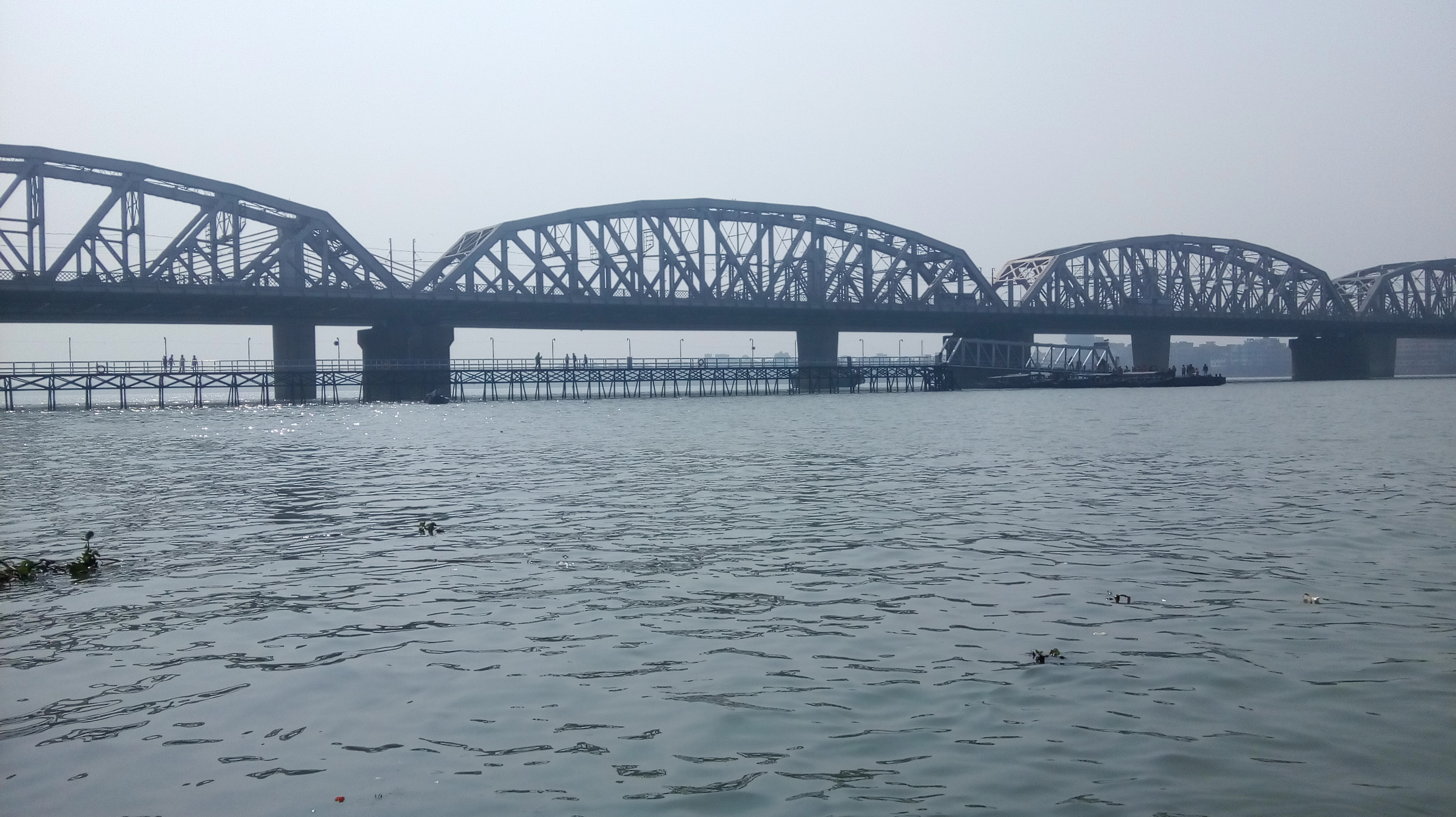
Vivekananda Setu sunrise view

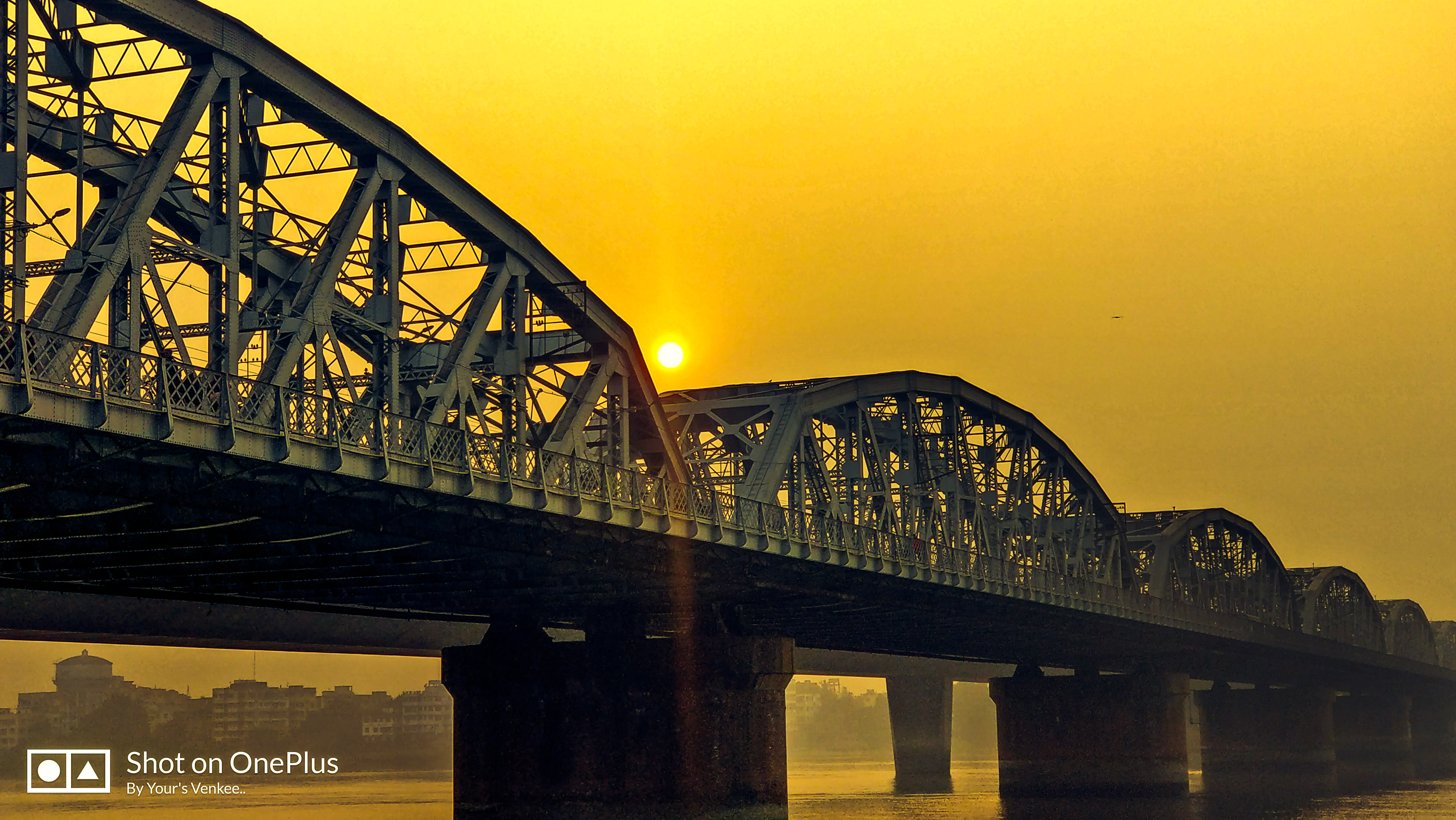
Vivekananda Setu during sunset

The consulting engineers for the bridge were Rendel, Palmer and Tritton. The erection and caissoning of the bridge was done by the noted Kutchi railway contractor and industrialist Rai Bahadur Jagmal Raja. His nameplate can still be seen on each girder of the bridge. The construction of bridge started in year 1926 and was completed in year 1931. The fabrication of the bridge was done at works of Braithwaite & Company, Calcutta.

The viaduct consists of 22 spans of 9.1 metres (30 ft) girders built of masonry piers, whose foundations have been piled with reinforced concrete piles 12 to 15 metres (40 to 50 ft) long. The bridge itself consists of seven 110 metres (350 ft) main spans and two 24 metres (80 ft) land spans. The eight main piers in the river are founded on octagonal steel caissons, 21 by 11 metres (70 by 37 ft), having two dredging holes each 5.8 metres (19 ft) in diameter. The caissons were all floated into position and founded by loading with concrete, sustaining the load on compressed air buoyancy and releasing the air on a suitable falling tide. The bridge is approximately 0.80 kilometres (0.5 mi) long with 10-kilometre (6.2 mi) long approach roads on both sides. The foundation was laid with well-sinking 30 metres (100 ft) down the river beds. Girding, erection of abutments and arching were all done by Rai Bahadur Jagmal Raja. This railway bridge is also important in the annals of history of railways in India because the railway for the first time crossed over River Hooghly and reached Calcutta at Sealdah Terminus thus connecting the East and West banks of the river.

The bridge was by far the most expensive and the most difficult of the railway bridges to be constructed in India up to that time. The bridge was constructed at a total cost of ₹1.14 crore (equivalent to ₹348 crore or US$36 million in 2023)

The first train that ran across the bridge was named Jagmal Raja Howrah Express by the British, acknowledging the feat of Rai Bahadur Jagmal Raja. The bridge cost over ₹1 crore (US$100,000) in those years.

== Usage ==
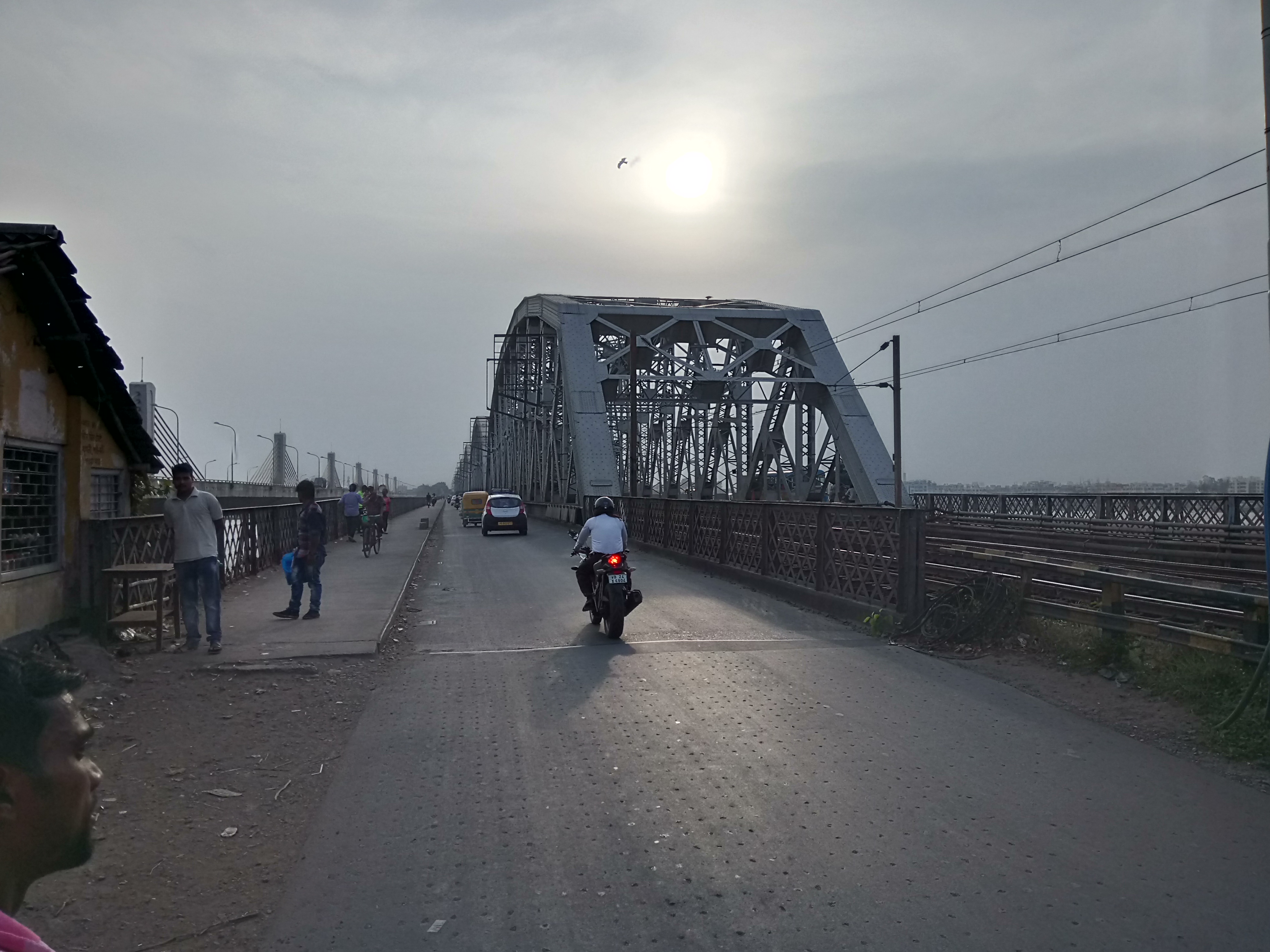
Front View of Vivekananda Setu

The bridge serves both road and rail:

- Rail - the railway line through the bridge forms a part of the Calcutta Chord link line which connects Sealdah Station with the Howrah–Bardhaman chord line and Howrah–Kharagpur line.
- Road - the bridge connects the Grand Trunk Road (Howrah side - West bank) with the Barrackpore Trunk Road (Kolkata side - East bank).

The bridge had become weak as a result of ageing, and with heavy traffic, even repairs became difficult. Thus a second road bridge, the Nivedita Setu was constructed parallel to it and around 165 feet (50 m) downstream. It was opened to traffic in 2007. Following this the Vivekananda Setu allows traffic movement for light vehicles, namely passenger vehicles, while the Nivedita Setu helps traffic movement of heavy vehicles, like trucks. While trucks and other heavy vehicles are not allowed on the Vivekananda Setu, two and three wheelers are not allowed on the toll bridge of Nivedita Setu.

== See also ==
- Howrah Bridge
- Vidyasagar Setu
- Nivedita Setu
