= Braithwaite & Co. =

Indian public sector engineering company

Braithwaite and Co. Limited
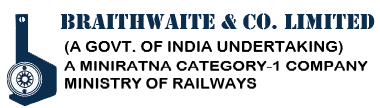
- Type: Public sector undertaking
- Industry: Heavy equipment; Structural steel; Rail wagon; Foundry products; Machinery
- Founded: 1913; 113 years ago in Calcutta, Bengal Presidency, British India (as a subsidiary of Braithwaite & Co. Engineers Limited (U.K.)); 28 February 1930; 96 years ago (as Braithwaite & Co (India) Ltd)
- Headquarters: Kolkata, West Bengal, India
- Key people: Ashwini Vaishnaw (Minister of Railways); Shri Naveen Kumar (Chairman & Managing Director)
- Revenue: ▲₹1,103.91 crore (US$110 million) (2024)
- Net income: ▼₹16.47 crore (US$1.7 million) (2024)
- Owner: Ministry of Railways, Government of India
- Parent: Indian Railways
- Website: www.braithwaiteindia.com

Braithwaite & Co. Limited is an Indian public sector undertaking which is engaged in the manufacture of railway wagons, cranes and other engineering services. It is wholly owned by the Government of India and under the administrative control of the Ministry of Railways. Its headquarters are located at Kolkata, West Bengal.

== Financials ==
The company reported total income of Rs. 1103.92 crores during the Financial Year ended 31 March 2024 as compared to Rs. 1044.76 crores during the Financial Year ended 31 March 2023.

There was a net profit of Rs. 16.47 crores reported for the Financial Year ended 31 March 2024 as against net profit of Rs. 49.73 crores for the Financial Year ended 31 March 2023.

== History ==
- The company was established in 1913 as the Indian Subsidiary of Braithwaite & Co. Engineers Limited (U.K.), for the fabrication of structural steel works.
- In 1930, it was incorporated as Braithwaite & Co (India) Ltd at Calcutta.
- In 1960, Braithwaite's Angus Works located at Champdani was set up to manufacture cranes, foundry products, machinery components, etc.
- In 1976, the company was nationalized and taken over by Government of India
- In 1978, the Project Division was established at Calcutta to execute turnkey projects for material handling plants.
- IN 1986, the company was one of five government undertakings, all of them related to heavy engineering and located in eastern India, which was placed under the umbrella of Bharat Heavy Udyam Ltd, a newly devised holding company
- In 1987, the Victoria Works was taken over, which is equipped with all facilities for the manufacture of pressure vessels, railway wagons, and heavy structurals for bridges and other engineering applications.
- In August 2010, the administrative control of the company was taken over by the Ministry of Railways.

== Manufacturing units ==
The company has three units – Clive Works, Victoria Works both in Calcutta, and Angus Works in Hooghly District, West Bengal. From 2010 the administrative control of the subsidiary has been taken over by the Indian Railways.

== Miniratna category-I status ==
Braithwaite & Co, under the UPA Government in 2010 got enlisted for disinvestment, since the engineering firm made a turnaround with a manifold increase in annual turnover and profits for three consecutive years, in January 2022 it received recognition as a Mini Ratna-I public sector undertaking.

== Present status ==
In 1986, Braithwaite & Co., Ltd. came under the umbrella of Bharat Bhari Udyog Nigam, which became holding company of five companies in eastern India, namely:

- Bharat Wagon and Engineering
- Braithwaite, Burn & Jessop Construction Company
- Braithwate & Co. Ltd,
- Burn Standard Company
- Jessop & Co. Ltd (this company was later privatized)

With effect from 2010, the management of Braithwaite & Co. Limited has been transferred from the Ministry of Heavy Industries & Public Enterprises to the Ministry of Railways, Government of India. Today Braithwaite is an engineering conglomerate that manufactures:

- Railway wagons & bogies
- Heavy-duty cranes
- Structurals
- Jute mill machinery and
- Forging & casting jobs.

== See also ==
- Chittaranjan Locomotive Works, Asansol
- Banaras Locomotive Works, Varanasi
- Diesel Locomotive Factory, Marhowrah
- Electric Locomotive Factory, Madhepura
- Integral Coach Factory, Chennai
- Modern Coach Factory, Raebareli
- Rail Coach Factory, Kapurthala
- Rail Wheel Plant, Bela
- Rail Wheel Factory, Yelahanka
