= Braithwaite, Burn & Jessop Construction Company =

PSU of the Government of India

The Braithwaite Burn & Jessop Construction Company
- Company type: Public Sector Undertaking
- Industry: construction, civil engineering
- Founded: 26 January 1935; 91 years ago
- Headquarters: Kolkata, India
- Area served: India
- Key people: Charles Alfred O'Grady Engineer
- Products: Construction & repairing of Rail Bridges, Rail-cum-Road bridges, Industrial Structural works, Large building foundation, Civil Engineering works, Refinery piping works, Railway gauge conversion.
- Owner: Department of Heavy Industries, Government of India
- Website: www.bbjconst.com

The Braithwaite Burn & Jessop Construction Company Limited (BBJ Construction Company) is a Public Sector Undertaking (PSU) of the Government of India under the Department of Heavy Industries. Established on 26 January 1935, BBJ Construction Company has been involved in the construction & repair of Rail Bridges & Rail-cum-Road Bridges, Industrial structural works, Large building foundations, Civil engineering works, Refinery piping works, Railway gauge conversion, etc. The company is registered and headquartered in Kolkata.

== History ==
The early story of BBJ started around the mid-thirties. The ever-increasing traffic movement between the twin cities of Calcutta & Howrah demanded a wider and stronger bridge in replacement of the then-existing pontoon bridge. The authorities accordingly decided to build a cantilever bridge across the river Hooghly. The job undoubtedly called for greater expertise. So the three engineering companies – Braithwaite, Burn & Jessop – came together and floated a new company. Thus, on 26 January 1935 was born BBJ, The Braithwaite Burn & Jessop Construction Company Limited.

The onward march began in 1941 with the Howrah Bridge, later named Rabindra Setu. Later in 1991 achievement is the second Hooghly Bridge or Vidyasagar Setu. In between BBJ constructed a number of engineering structures spread across the country and abroad.

The first Ganga Bridge of independent India Rajendra Setu at Mokameh-Barauni in Bihar, the Yamuna Bridge at Delhi, the Godavari Bridge at Rajamundry, the Krishna Bridge at Vijayawada, Brahmaputra Bridge at Pandu are some of the known achievements of the company.

=== Bharat Bhari Udyog Nigam ===
Bharat Bhari Udyog Nigam (BBUNL) was a Public Sector Undertaking (PSU) of the Government of India, established in 1986 as a Public Sector Holding Company under the administrative control of the Department of Heavy Industry and Public Enterprises, Government of India. In 1987, BBJ was nationalised, becoming a subsidiary of BBUNL. BBUNL became the holding company for four eastern Indian engineering companies:

- Burn Standard Company (Under Liquidation): With over two centuries of engineering expertise, Burn Standard & Co Ltd was a diversified company manufacturing Railway wagons & Track Equipment, Refractories, Castings & Forgings, Offshore Oil Platforms, Bridges & Steel Structures, Steel Plant Equipment, etc.
- Braithwaite & Co. Ltd.: starting with the fabrication of heavy steel structures, it also manufactures a large variety of railway freight wagons, including special-purpose wagons, tank wagons, bogies, cranes for ports & dockyards, and jute machinery.
- Bharat Wagon and Engineering (Under Liquidation): manufactured a wide range of Freight Wagons, Steel Structures for Road & Rail Bridges, Tanks for Refineries and Fuel Stations, Rollers for Sugar Mills, Transmission Towers, etc.
- Braithwaite, Burn & Jessop Construction Company: best known for bridge building. Starting from Calcutta's famous Howrah Bridge to the present – Vidyasagar Setu – one of Asia's largest Cable Stayed Bridge, BBJ & Construction Co Ltd has been involved in the design and construction of many varieties of Bridges in India. Also, the expertise available is utilised for Repairs & Restoration of Bridges destroyed by nature's fury.

The group engaged in the design, manufacture, supply, erection and commissioning of a wide range of Capital Goods and Turnkey Projects required by the Core Sector Industries, such as Coal Mines, Power, Petroleum and Oil, Ports, Railways, together with the Construction of Highways & Flyovers. It had an annual turnover of around US Dollar 100 million and had a total fabrication capacity of 24,000 MT per annum, employing about 3,372 skilled personnel. BBUNL group companies have been involved in most of the projects of national importance. Stepping up exports, the BBUNL group today has a diverse export profile, spread across forty countries worldwide.

The administrative control of M/s Bharat Wagon & Engg Co Ltd (BWEL), Patna, a central PSE and subsidiary of Bharat Bhari Udyog Nigam Ltd (BBUNL) was transferred from the Department of Heavy Industry, Ministry of Heavy Industries and Public Enterprises to the Ministry of Railways w.e.f 13 August 2008 (AN).

BBUNL reported aggregated revenues of ₹36,856,000 (US$380,000) during fiscal 2006

BBJ is also involved in the installation of major steel plants, thermal power stations, oil refineries, and fertilizer projects. BBJ has also undertaken restoration of damaged bridges, industrial structures, and civil construction of major commercial and administrative buildings.

With effect from 10 July 2015, BBJ merged into BBUNL; then, on 18 November 2015 BBUNL changed its name to "The Braithwaite Burn and Jessop Construction Company Limited".

== See also ==
- Howrah Bridge
- Vidyasagar Setu
