= Nivedita Setu =

Multi-span extradosed bridge

Nivedita Setu নিবেদিতা সেতু
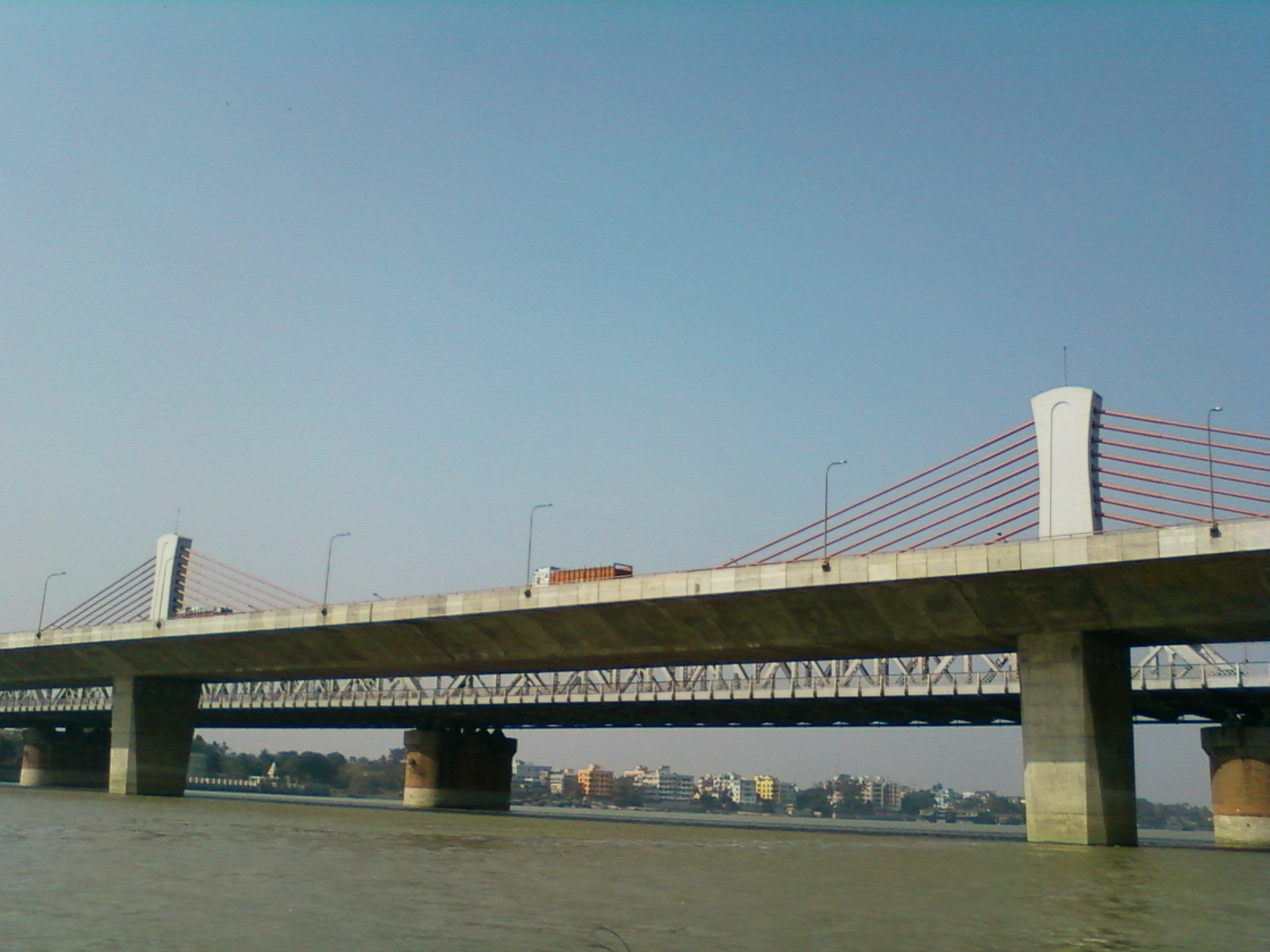
- Nivedita Setu, with Vivekananda Setu behind, from the Hooghly River
- Coordinates: 22°39′08″N 88°21′12″E
- Carries: Belghoria Expressway, which is a part of NH-12, roadway only
- Crosses: Hooghly River
- Locale: Dakshineswar, Kolkata metropolitan region, India
- Named for: Sister Nivedita
- Owner: National Highways Authority of India
- Maintained by: Second Vivekananda Bridge Tollway Company Pvt. Ltd

Characteristics
- Design: Multi-span Extradosed bridge
- Total length: 880 metres (2,890 ft)
- Width: 29 metres (95 ft)
- No. of spans: 7
- Piers in water: 6
- No. of lanes: 6

History
- Architect: Consulting Engineering Services (CES); International Bridge Technologies Inc. (IBT)
- Constructed by: Larsen & Toubro
- Construction start: April 2004
- Construction cost: ₹650 crore (equivalent to ₹23 billion or US$240 million in 2023)
- Opened: July 2007; 19 years ago

Statistics
- Daily traffic: ~45,000 Vehicles
- Toll: Yes, Tolled by SVBTC Ltd.

Location
- Interactive map of Nivedita Setu

Nivedita Setu is a multi-span extradosed bridge spanning the Hooghly River, connecting Bally, Howrah with Dakshineswar, Kolkata. It runs parallel to and about 50m downstream of the old Vivekananda Setu, opened in 1932. The bridge is named after Sister Nivedita, the social worker-disciple of Swami Vivekananda. The bridge is one of only five roadway bridges crossing the Hooghly River within the Kolkata metropolitan region. Belghoria Expressway which connects the meeting point of NH-16 with NH-19 at Dankuni to NH 12, Kalyani Expressway, Kolkata Airport and northern parts of Kolkata passes over the bridge. The bridge is designed to carry 48,000 vehicles per day.

== Design ==
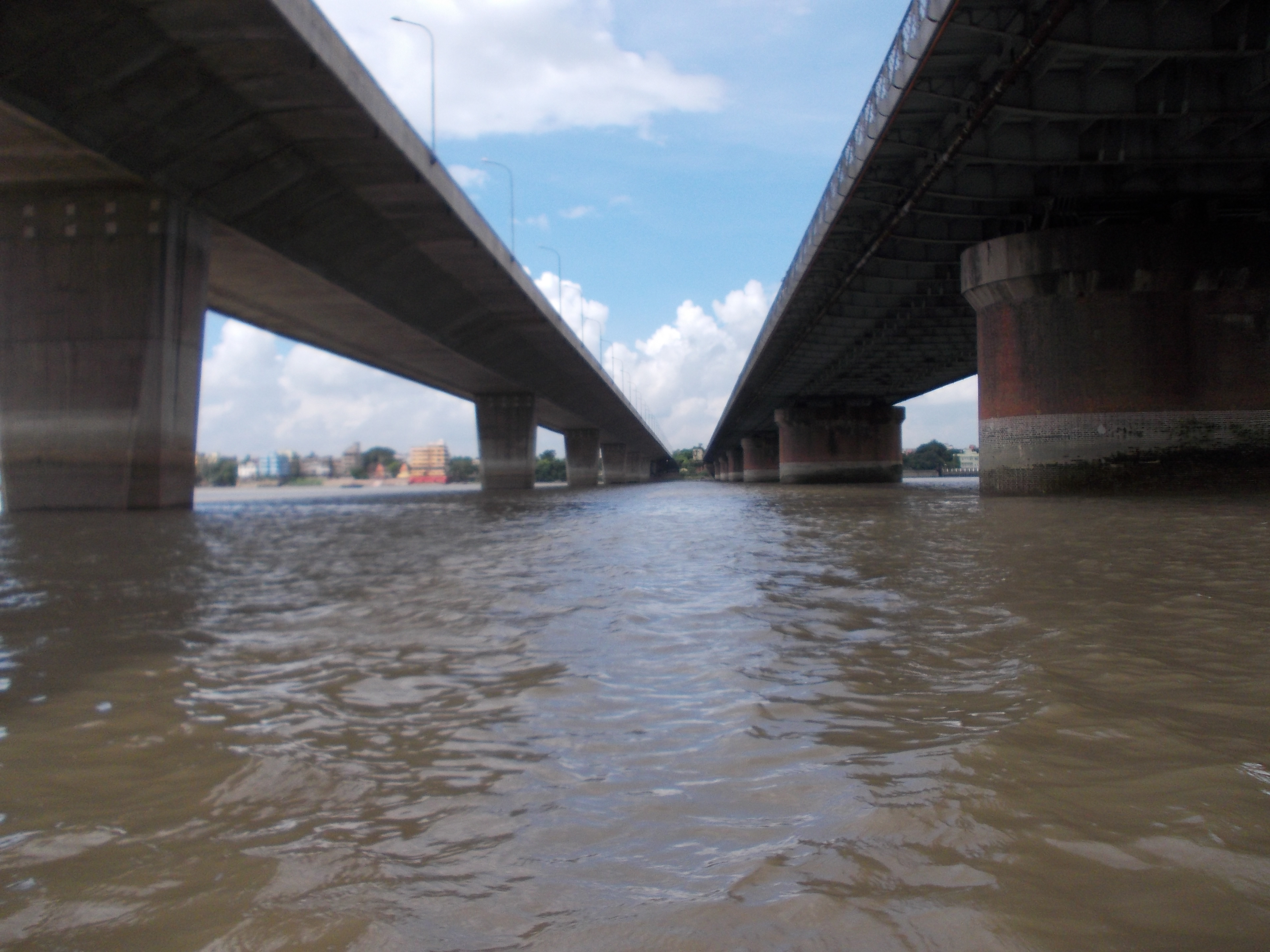
Twin bridges: 2007 Nivedita Setu (left) and 1932 Vivekananda Setu (right), from the Hooghly River

The 1932 Vivekananda Setu had become weak as a result of ageing and with heavy traffic even repairs became difficult. There was need for a second bridge.

The main challenge was to design and construct a new bridge that did not mar the view of the old Vivekananda Setu, did not dwarf the historically important Dakshineswar Kali Temple which is located well within visible distance, and carry substantially higher levels of fast traffic for around half a century.

The bridge rests on deep-well foundations going down to the river bed level. It carries six lanes for high speed traffic. The carriageway is supported by 254 pre-stressed concrete girders. Cables from 14m high pylons extend additional support.

Nivedita Setu is the first bridge in the country that is a single profile cable-stayed bridge. By design, the height of the columns are lower than the tip of the Dakshineswar temple.

== Construction ==
This bridge is estimated to cost approximately Rs. 650 crore. The construction of the bridge started in April 2004, by the construction giant Larsen and Toubro and was opened to traffic in a record time in July 2007.

The bridge is the India's first multi-span, single-plane cable-supported extradosed bridge; with short pylons and seven continuous spans of 110 m, totaling a length of 880 m (2,887 feet). It is 29 m wide and supports 6 lanes of traffic.

== Award ==
Nivedita Setu has won an Award of Excellence from the American Segmental Bridge Institute, USA.

== Toll ==
Category of Vehicles	Fee per vehicle per one way trip w.e.f. 04.07.2023
Class-1 - Car, Passenger Van or Jeep	Rs 65
Class-2 - Bus	Rs 125
Class-3 - Light Good Vehicle (LGV)	Rs 175
Class-4 - Truck	Rs 300
Class-5 - Multi Axle vehicles (MAV), Earth Moving Equipment (EME) and Heavy Construction Machinery (HCM) including without limitation, oversized vehicles carrying boilers, turbines generators	Rs 350

== See also ==
- Vidyasagar Setu
- Howrah Bridge
- Second Ishwar Gupta Setu
- List of longest bridges in the world
- List of longest bridges above water in India
