= Vidyasagar Setu =

Cable-stayed toll bridge in West Bengal, India

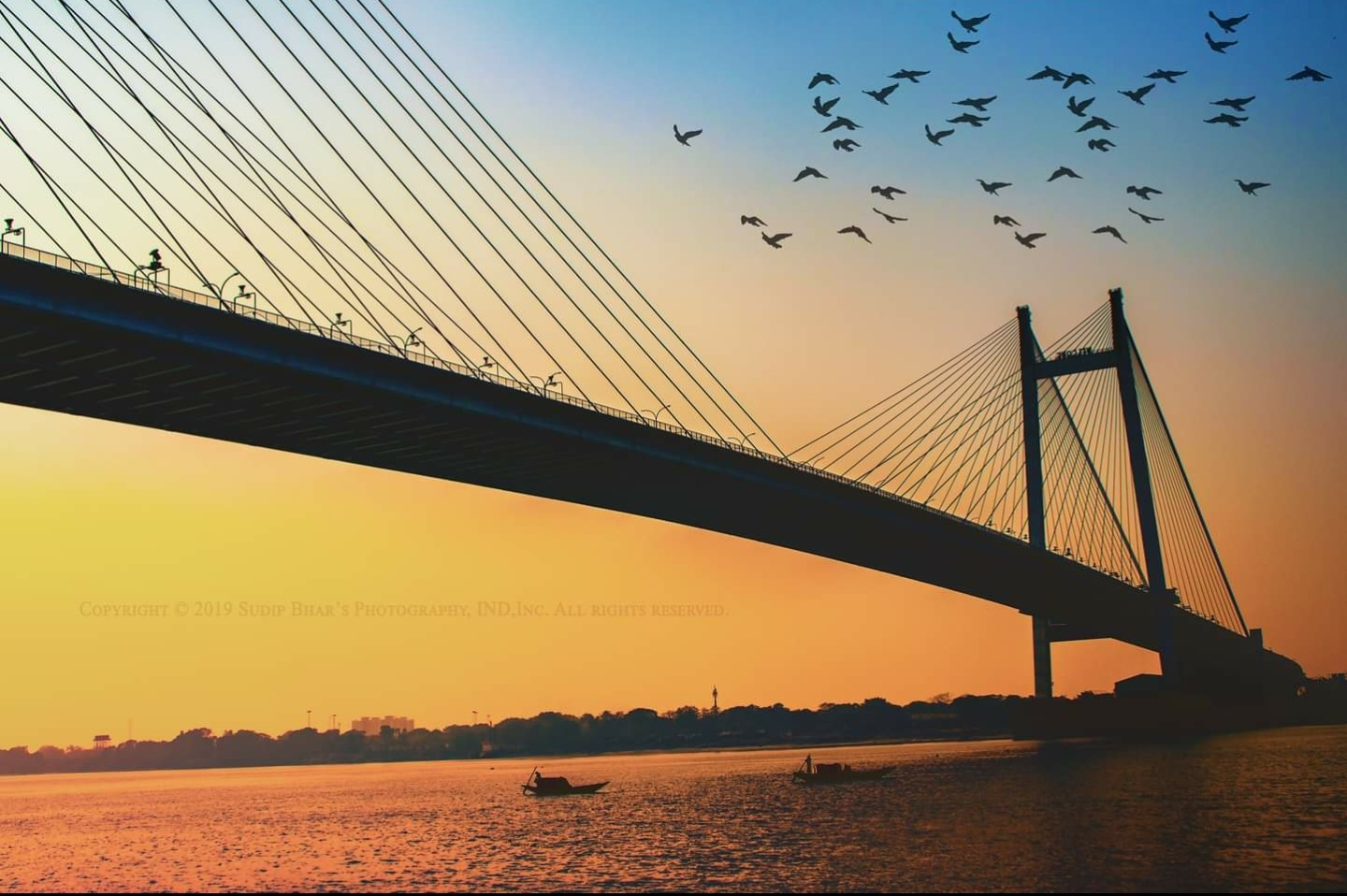
- Vidyasagar Setu from Prinsep Ghat
- Coordinates: 22.557105°N 88.327757°E
- Carries: Kona Expressway, which is a part of National Highway 12 (India), Roadway only
- Crosses: Hooghly River
- Locale: Kolkata and Howrah, West Bengal
- Official name: Vidyasagar Setu
- Other name: Second Hooghly Bridge
- Named for: Ishwar Chandra Vidyasagar
- Maintained by: Hooghly River Bridge Commissioners

Characteristics
- Design: Cable-stayed bridge
- Total length: 822.96 metres (2,700 ft)
- Width: 35 metres (115 ft)
- Longest span: 457.2 metres (1,500 ft)
- Clearance below: 26 metres (85 ft)
- No. of lanes: 6

History
- Constructed by: The Braithwaite Burn & Jessop Construction Company Limited
- Construction start: July 3, 1979; 46 years ago
- Opened: October 10, 1992; 33 years ago

Statistics
- Daily traffic: ~90,000 vehicles (as of 2018)
- Toll: Yes, toll bridge

Location
- Interactive map of Vidyasagar Setu

Vidyasagar Setu, also known as the Second Hooghly Bridge, is an 822.96-metre-long (2,700 ft) cable-stayed six-laned toll bridge over the Hooghly River in West Bengal, India, linking the cities of Kolkata and Howrah. Opened in 1992, Vidyasagar Setu was the first and longest cable-stayed bridge in India at the time of its inauguration. It was the second bridge to be built across the Hooghly River in Kolkata metropolitan region and was named after the education reformer Pandit Ishwar Chandra Vidyasagar. The project had a cost of ₹388 crore to build. The project was a joint effort between the public and private sectors, under the control of the Hooghly River Bridge Commissioners (HRBC).

The importance of the bridge has increased manifold since 2013, as the West Bengal State Secretariat had shifted its office to Nabanna, located adjacent to the bridge on the Howrah side.

Initially, under the toll collection regime of the HRBC, daily traffic was recorded to be a minimum of 28,000 vehicles and a maximum of 39,000 vehicles in 2000, but fell to a maximum of around 30,000 vehicles by December 2002, when the management of the toll plaza was handed over to a private firm. Subsequently, the daily traffic reached a minimum of 45,000 vehicles and a maximum of 61,000 vehicles by early 2008, against a maximum capacity of 85,000 vehicles per day. The original management of the toll revenue collection by HRBC was consequently criticized for corruption and significant loss of revenue.

== History ==
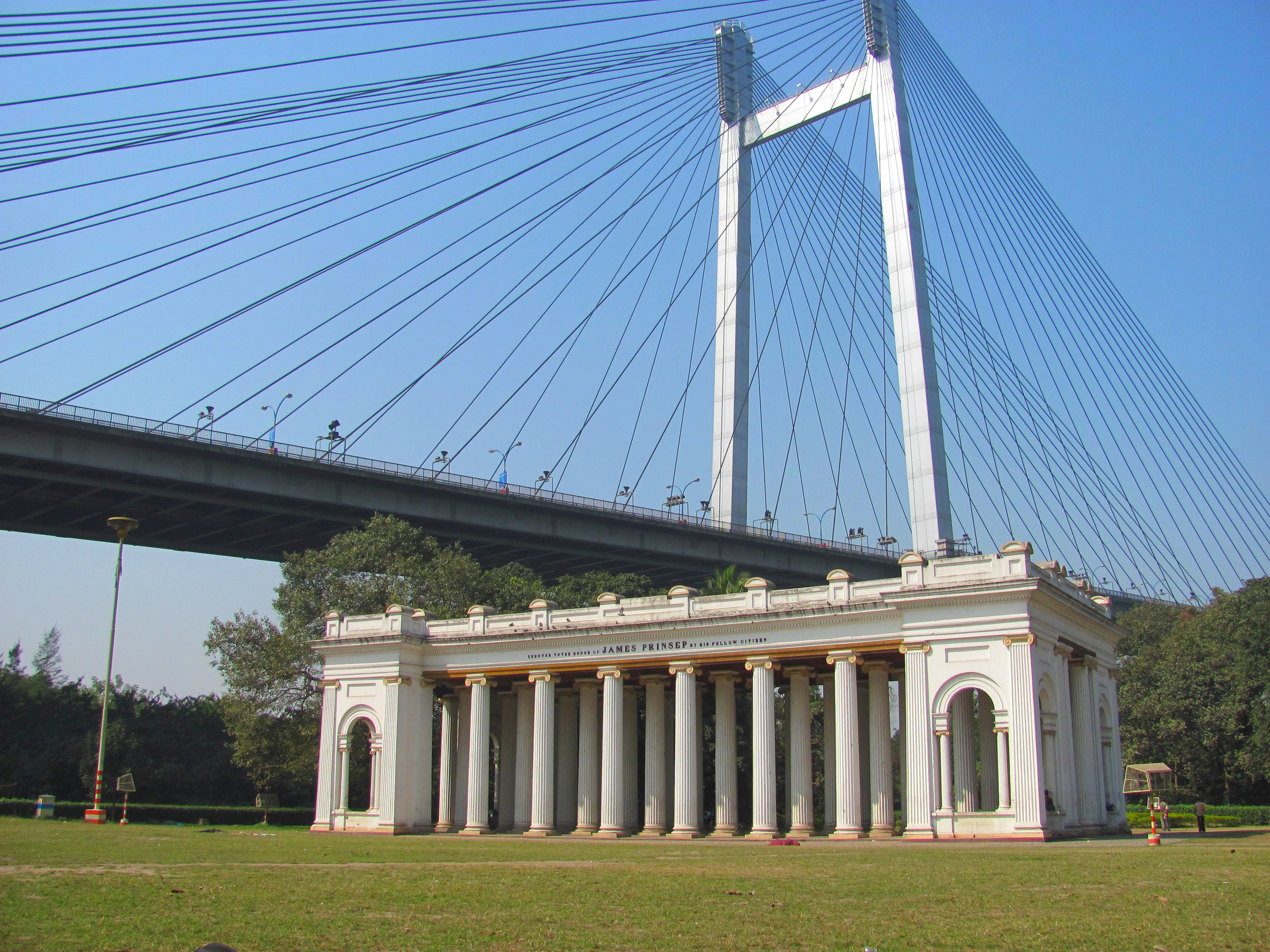
The bridge seen with the Prinsep Ghat

Population and commercial activity grew rapidly after India gained independence in August 1947. The only link across the Hooghly River, the Howrah Bridge between Howrah and Kolkata, was subject to much traffic congestion, with over 85,000 vehicles every day. This necessitated planning for a new bridge across the river so that it could connect to the major cities of Mumbai (Bombay), Delhi and Chennai (Madras) through the national highways located close to the bridge.

The foundation stone for the bridge was laid by Indian National Congress (INC) in 1972. At that time, Honourable P.M. of India was Smt. Indira Gandhi & Honourable C.M. of West Bengal was Shri Siddhartha Shankar Ray. The bridge took 20 years to complete and cost ₹3.88 billion (equivalent to ₹30 billion or US$350 million in 2023), but during seven of those years there was no construction activity. The bridge is named after the 19th-century Bengali education reformer Pandit Ishwar Chandra Vidyasagar. Work on the cable-stayed bridge started with the construction of the well curb on the Kolkata bank on 3 July 1979.

There are three other bridges on the Hooghly River connecting Kolkata with Howrah district: Vivekananda Setu built in 1930, (road-cum-rail bridge) – the first to be commissioned, and which had become old and needed repairs; Howrah Bridge, a cantilever bridge commissioned in 1943, now renamed as Rabindra Setu (since 1965 in honour of the Nobel Laureate Rabindranath Tagore); and Nivedita Setu (named after Sister Nivedita), also known as the Second Vivekananda Setu, which is 50 metres (160 ft) downstream from the old Vivekananda Setu and was commissioned on 4 June 2007. Kona Expressway and Vidyasagar Setu experienced an exponential rise in the volume of traffic over a couple of years. Over 100,000 vehicles take the expressway to reach Kolkata via Vidyasagar Setu.

== Construction ==
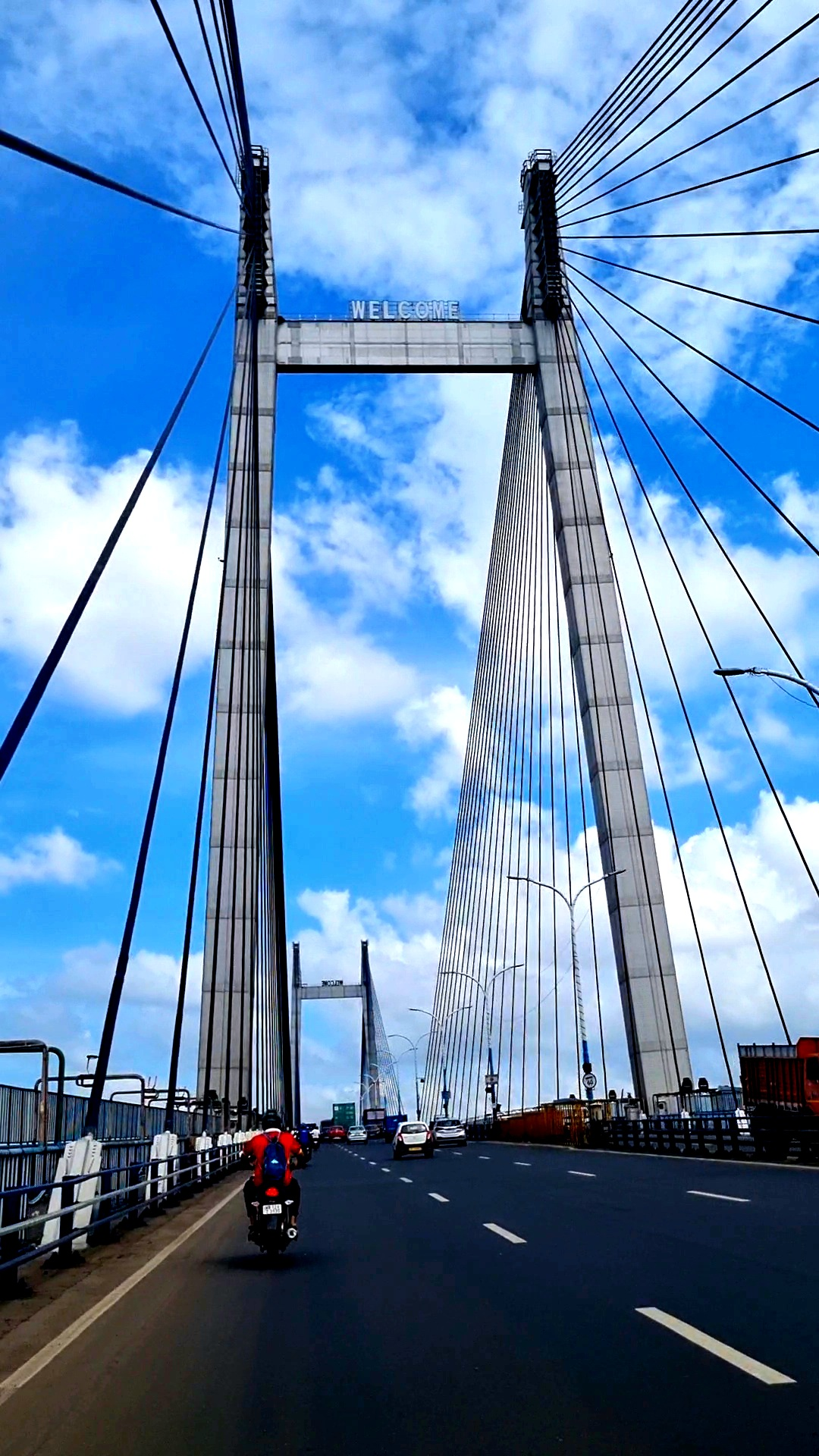
Vidyasagar Setu in July 2023

The bridge was designed by Schlaich Bergermann & Partner, and checked by Freeman Fox & Partners and Bharat Bhari Udyog Nigam Limited. Construction was carried out by the consortium of "The Braithwaite Burn and Jessop Construction Company Limited" (BBJ). The Hooghly River Bridge Commission (HRBC) was responsible for the commissioning operations of the bridge. Construction began on 3 July 1979, and the bridge was commissioned on 10 October 1992 by the Hooghly River Bridge Commission.

== Architectural features ==
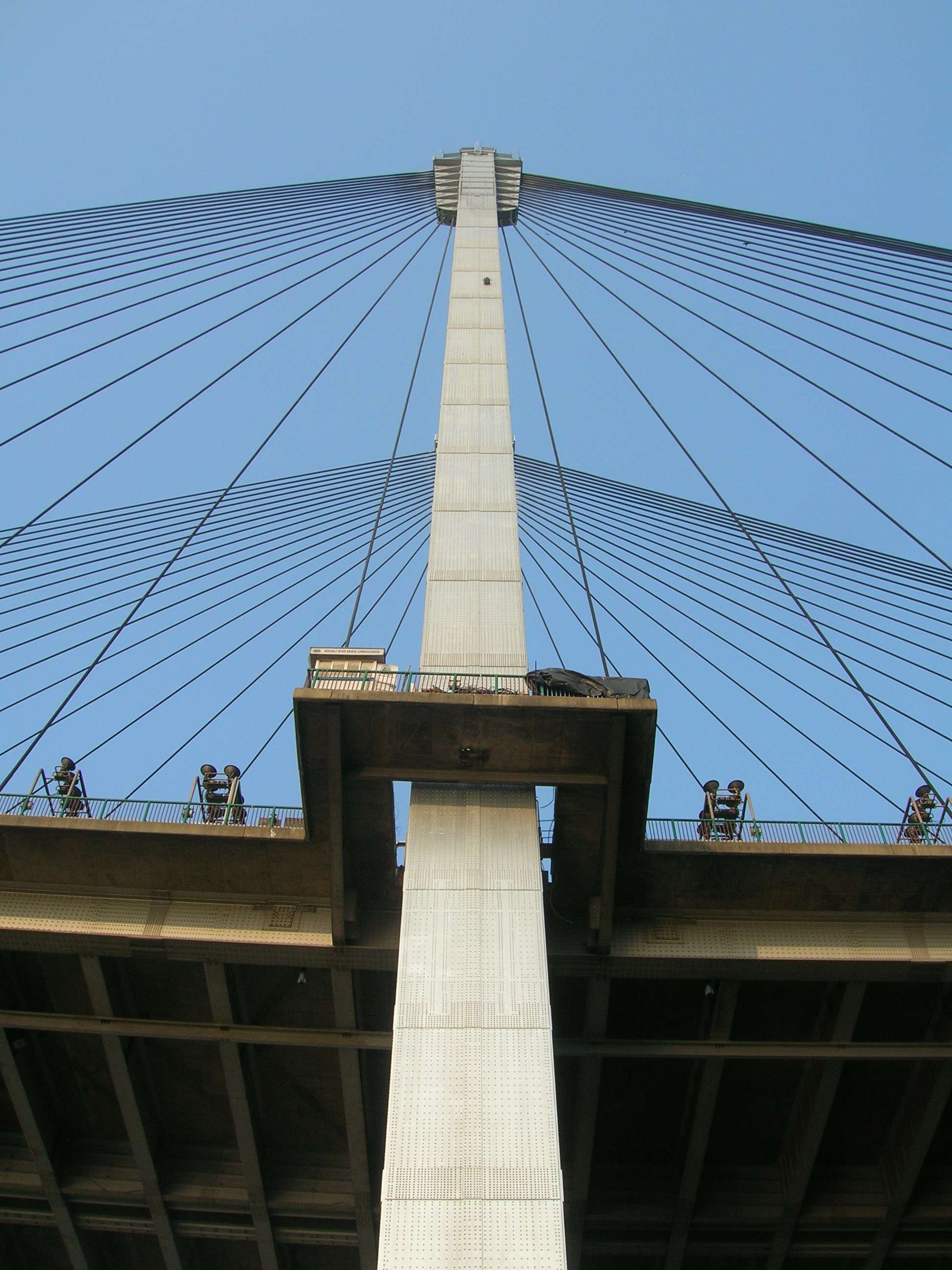
One of the four pylons of the Vidyasagar Setu

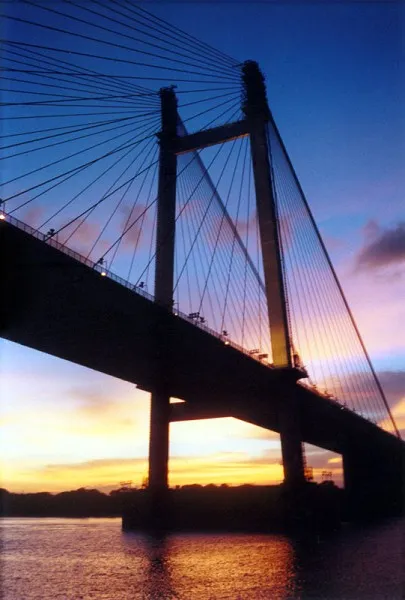
Vidyasagar Setu in 2002

Vidyasagar Setu is a cable-stayed bridge, with 121 cables in a fan arrangement, built using steel pylons 127.62 metres (418.7 ft) high. With a total length of 823 metres (2,700 ft), Vidyasagar Setu is the longest cable-stayed bridge in India (the longer 3rd Narmada Bridge in Gujarat is an extradosed bridge). The deck is made of composite steel-reinforced concrete with two carriageways. The total width of the bridge is 35 metres (115 ft), with 3 lanes in each direction and a 1.2-metre (3 ft 11 in)-wide footpath on each side. The deck over the main span is 457.20 metres (1,500.0 ft) long. The two side spans are supported by parallel wire cables and are 182.88 metres (600.0 ft) long. Vidyasagar Setu is a toll bridge. It has capacity to handle more than 85,000 vehicles in a day.

The design of the bridge differs slightly from other bridges, which are of live load composite construction. The difference is in the dead load design concept adopted for this bridge and concreting of the side spans done with support provided by the intermediate trestle. The deck is designed with a grid structure of girders. One set of girders are at the end and another set in the middle, which are braced by girders spaced on an average at 4.2 metres (14 ft) centre to centre.

A deck crane was used for the construction of the main span of the bridge. A specially designed crane of 45 tonne capacity was used to erect the pylons of the bridge. The structural steel used in the bridge weighs about 13,200 tonnes. The pylons, which are 128 metres (420 ft) in height, are designed as free standing portals. They are provided with two cross portal members, one at the bottom and another at the top, below the pylon head. The deck is connected to the end piers by bolts embedded in the chambers of the piers. Pylons made of 4 m × 4 m (13 ft × 13 ft) steel boxes of riveted construction were raised on the two side spans of the bridge; one set is on the Kolkata side and the other is on the Howrah side. The six pylons on the Kolkata side of the bridge were installed using 75 MT and 50 MT cranes, while on the Howrah end, a single 50 MT crane was used. Anchorage of the pylon with the base of piers was effected through tie rods anchored in the piers. Cables were erected from the four pylon heads with the help of 32 hoist frames. The hoist frames were mounted on top of each pylon. Sheave blocks, winches and snatch blocks were used to facilitate the lifting, and cables inside the pylons were stressed with jacks. Pressure grouting was performed to fill the voids between the wire and the high-density polyethylene (HDPE) tubes. A two tonne tower crane, fixed inside the pylons, lifted the cables into position.

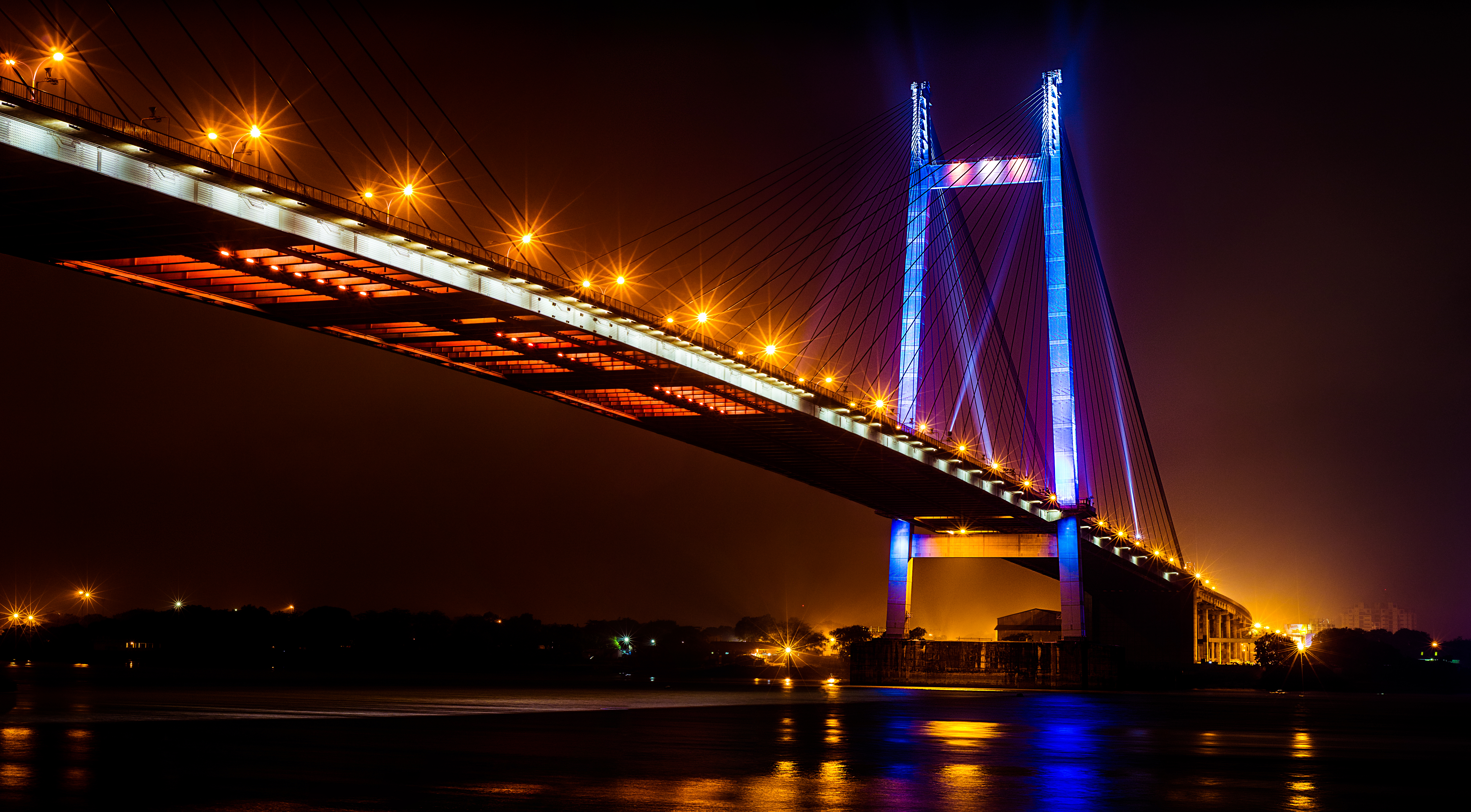
The bridge illuminated in the night

The bridge has been subject to prototype wind tunnel tests at the Indian Institute of Science in Bangalore. Bearings are used in vertical and horizontal directions, with grouted collars in four segments at the two end piers and horizontal bearings at the two middle piers to achieve stability against lateral movement. Maurer Söhne expansion joints were provided to allow for 400-millimetre (16 in) horizontal expansion at the free ends. 115-millimetre (4.5 in) fixed-end slab seal type expansion joints were used for horizontal expansion of the joints. Other essential components provided in the bridge structure are the handrails, lightning arresters, crash barriers, gas service support structures, telephone and electric lines, lifts in the pylons, and a maintenance gantry.

== Post-construction plans ==
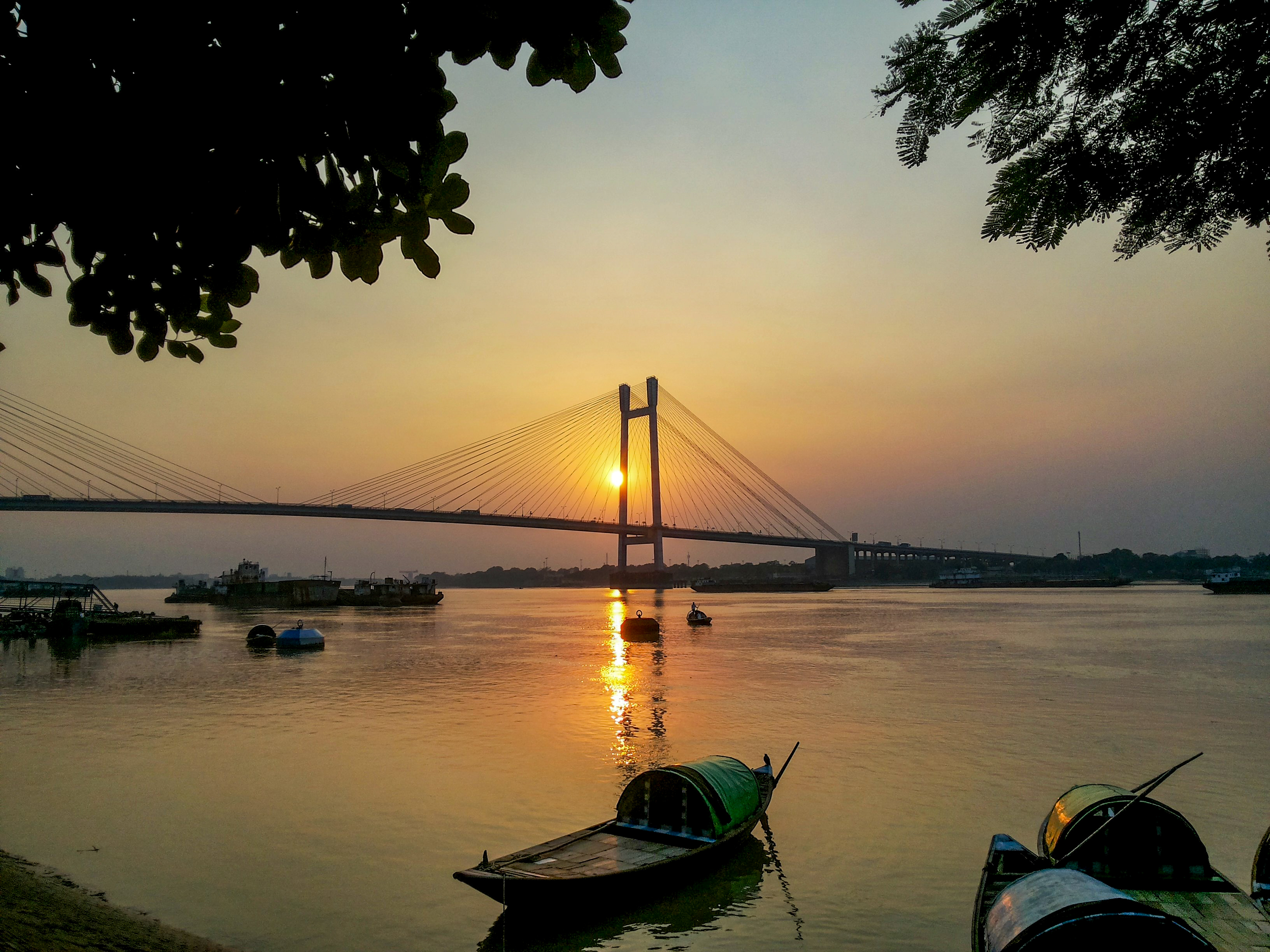
The bridge during sunset

Over the years, several accidents have occurred on the bridge resulting in traffic congestion, and sometimes closure of the bridge for a few hours at a time. To relieve the heavy traffic congestion at the entry to the bridge, the Hooghly River Bridge Commissioners (HRBC) plan to build two one-way exit and entry ramps. These are planned with a semi-circular layout in the form of side wings, which will facilitate easier flow of traffic before the toll plaza on roads leading to the Howrah railway station. There are also plans to improve the lighting on the bridge by installing LED lamps and searchlights covering the four pylons, the bridge spans, cables and under-deck. An electronic toll collection system was scheduled to be introduced by 2014, to help improve the flow of traffic across the bridge.

The traffic projections for the bridge at the planning stage have not been reached. A traffic survey carried out during one week in June 2012 recorded traffic of 29,000 vehicles over the bridge in comparison to a projected 85,000. A survey conducted during the same period in June 2012 indicated a figure of 31,865 vehicles, though it is reported by the concerned traffic and transportation engineer that the rate of increase in traffic has been one percent per year on the basis of traffic surveys carried out from the time of commissioning of the bridge. The reason for the fall in traffic during 2012 is attributed to the peak monsoon effect during the survey period.

== See also ==
- List of largest cable-stayed bridges
- List of longest bridges in the world
- List of longest bridges above water in India

== Bibliography ==
- Gunguly, C. K.; Battarcharya, S. K. (2000). Dayaratnam, P (ed.). The Design Methodology and Construction Technique of 457 m Span Cable Stayed Bridge (Dead Load Composite) at Vidyasagar Setu. Universities Press (India). pp. 113–4. ISBN 978-81-7371-271-5.
- Bhattacherje, S. B. (2009). Encyclopaedia of Indian Events & Dates. Sterling Publishers Pvt. ISBN 978-81-207-4074-7.
