= Bharat Wagon and Engineering =

Rolling stock manufacturer

Bharat Wagon And Engineering
- Company type: Subsidiary
- Industry: Rail transport
- Founded: 1978; 48 years ago
- Defunct: 2017
- Headquarters: Patna, Bihar, India
- Area served: Worldwide
- Products: Locomotives; High-speed trains Intercity and commuter trains Trams; People movers Signalling systems

Bharat Wagon and Engineering Limited (BWEL) was a Public Sector Undertaking (PSU) of the Government of India as a subsidiary of Bharat Bhari Udyog Nigam. The company was established on 4 December 1978 after taking over and merging two sick companies - Arthur Butler & Co and Britannia Engineering Company.

At one time, BWEL was the largest rail wagon manufacturer in India. In fiscal 2006, the company enjoyed aggregated revenues of ₹154.4 million (US$1.6 million).

== Plants ==
Headquartered in Patna, the company has two manufacturing plants, both located in Bihar, one in Muzaffarpur and the other in Mokama. Both of these plants are located directly next to railway stations and they come equipped with railway sidings and other facilities such as assured power supply. The MUzaffarpur plant sits on prime urban land in the heart of the city. The Mokama plant, on the other hand, is situated in the middle of a forested area.

== Liquidation ==
In December 2000, the company was referred to Board for Industrial and Financial Reconstruction (BIFR). By this time, The company had been running at loss for many years. It was finally declared as a sick unit in year 2002. The Government of India planned to sell Muzaffarpur plant of the Company in 2002 to the private sector, but could not do so after resistance from employees and trade unions. The administrative control of M/s Bharat Wagon & Engg Co Ltd (BWEL), Patna is transferred from the Department of Heavy Industry, Ministry of Heavy Industries and Public Enterprises to the Ministry of Railways w.e.f 13 August 2008. In August 2017, on recommendation of NITI Aayog, the Cabinet Committee on Economic Affairs announced the closure of loss-making BWEL.
