= Burn Standard Company Limited =

Indian railway wagon manufacturing company

- Type: Public Sector Undertaking
- Industry: transportation
- Founded: 1976; 50 years ago
- Headquarters: Howrah, India
- Area served: India
- Key people: Mr. Mohammad Asad Alam, Chairman & Managing Director
- Products: rolling stock
- Owner: Government of India
- Website: www.burnstandard.com

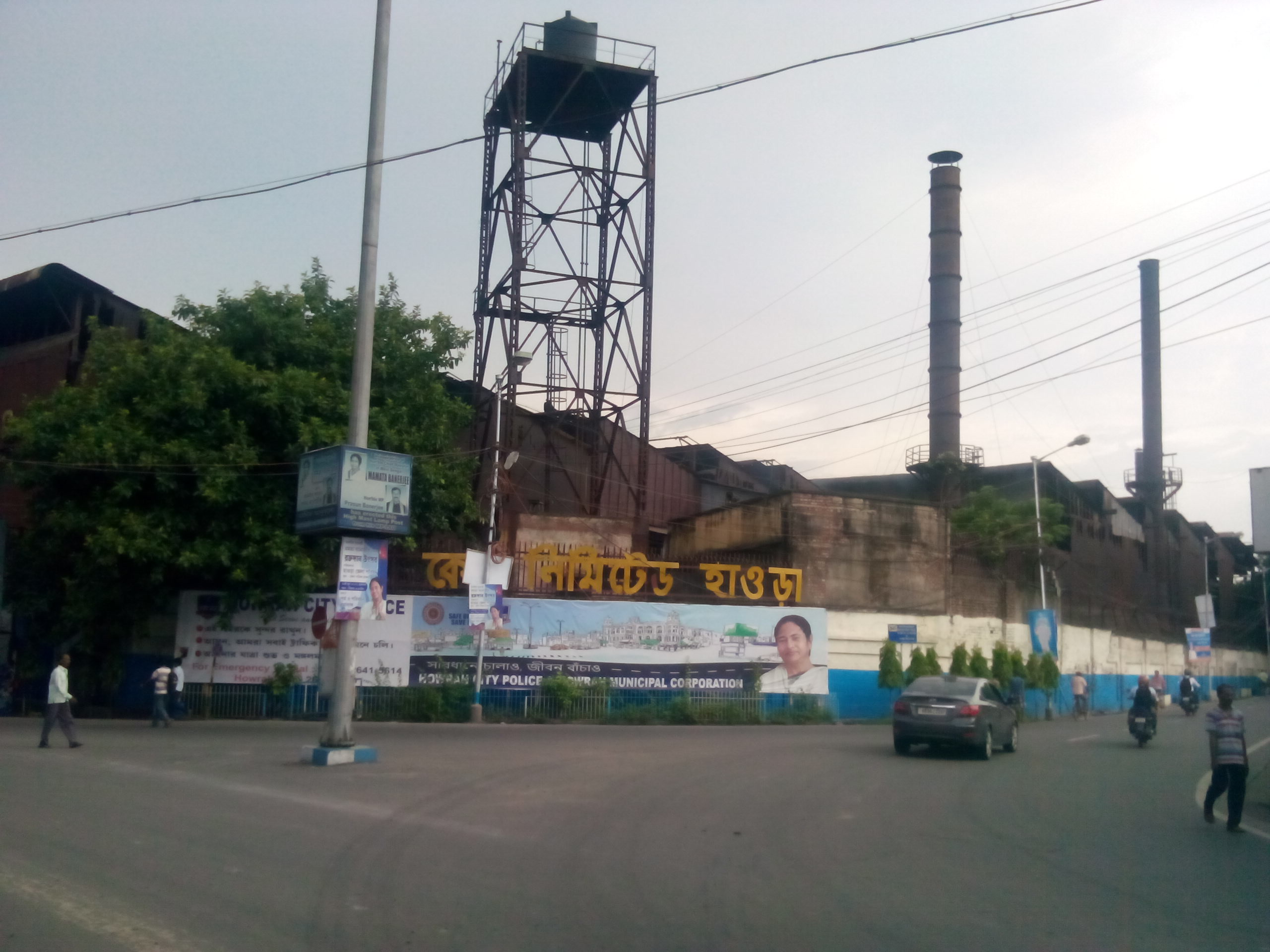
Burn standard company Ltd

Burn Standard Company Limited (BSCL) is a Public Sector Undertaking (PSU) of the Government of India. Headquartered in Howrah, India, BSCL is engaged mainly in railway wagon manufacturing under the Ministry of Railways. On 4 April 2018, the Cabinet approved closure of loss making Burn Standard Company Limited. The company was formed with the merger of two companies – Burn & Company (founded 1781) and Indian Standard Wagon (founded 1918), and was nationalised in 1975. In fiscal 2006, the company reported aggregated revenues of ₹1,373 million (US$14 million). Subsequently, the company with its two engineering units at Howrah and Burnpur came under the administrative control of Ministry of Railways in September 2010. The refractory unit at Salem, Tamil Nadu, was transferred to Steel Authority of India Limited.

According to the UK-based newspaper Independent, in March 2008, John Messer, the lead in-house lawyer for the US engineering firm McDermott International, was still seeking payment for a contract originally drawn up in the late 1980s to construct a large offshore platform for the Mumbai High oil field. In October 2006, Burn Standard, the Indian engineering company that had sub-contracted portions of the project to McDermott, lost its appeal against a court ruling ordering it to pay the US firm $90 million (£45 million). The outstanding amount was ultimately paid following the conclusion of arbitration and intervention by the Government of India.

== Products and services ==
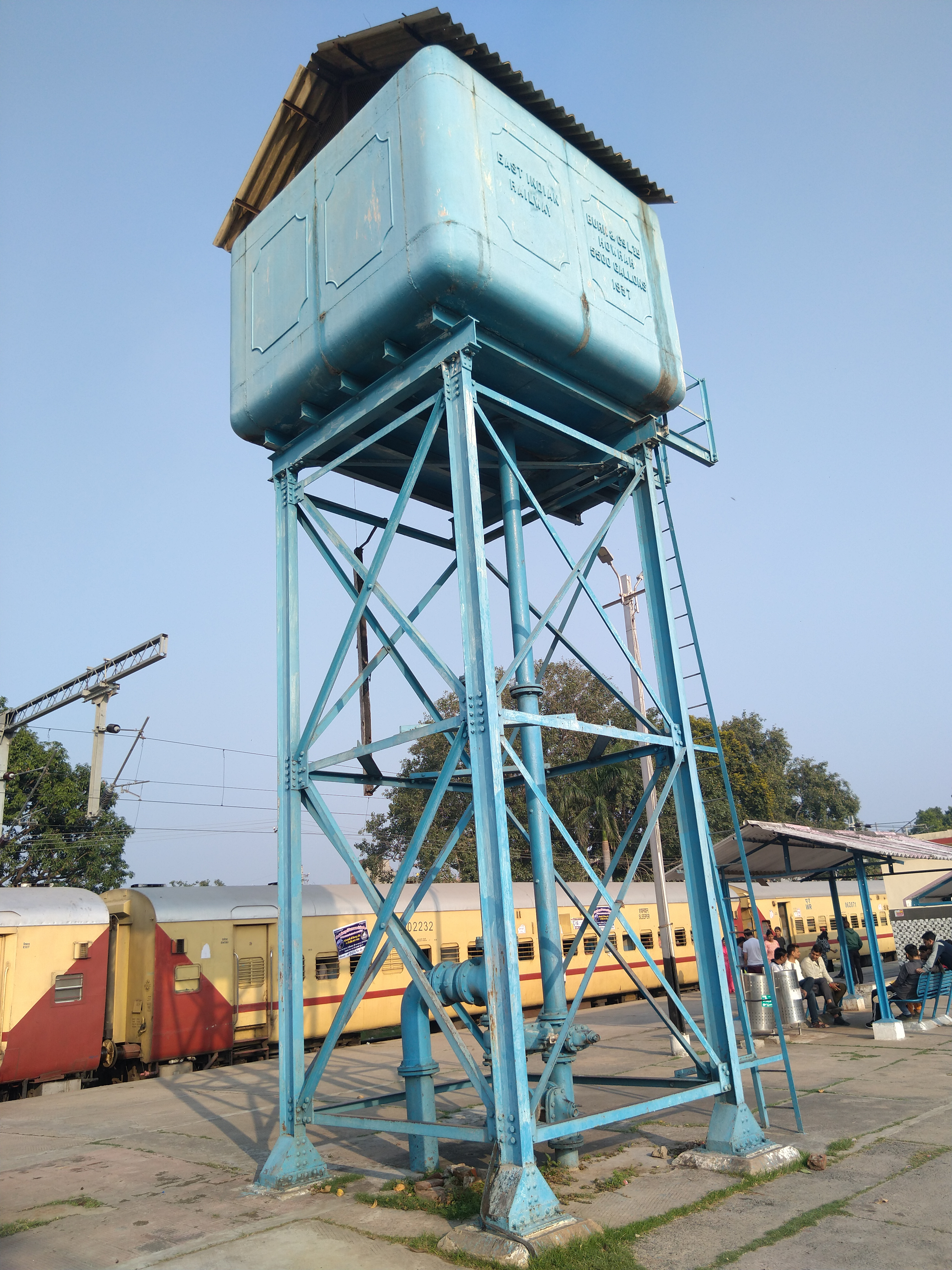
Water tank built by Burn & Co in 1937 for East Indian Railway at Phaphund railway station

- Railway wagons: tanker, hopper, flat
- Casnub bogies
- Couplers and Draft Gears
- Steel Castings, Pressings, Forgings
- Bridge Girders, Structurals, Sleepers, Points and Crossings, Wagon Components
- Wagon refurbishment
  - Burn Standard India renovated SLC Type for the CLC system in Kolkata in 1980s.
- Ash/coal plant construction
- In the mid-1980s, Burn Standard had started an offshore construction unit at Jellingham, East Midnapore, West Bengal. The products were decks, helidecks, and jackets for Bombay High.

== Liquidation ==
On the 4 April 2018, the Government of India approved the liquidation of Burn Standard Company.

== See also ==
- Banaras Locomotive Works, Varanasi
- Chittaranjan Locomotive Works, Asansol
- Diesel Locomotive Factory, Marhowrah
- Electric Locomotive Factory, Madhepura
- Integral Coach Factory, Chennai
- Modern Coach Factory, Raebareli
- Rail Coach Factory, Kapurthala
- Rail Wheel Plant, Bela
- Rail Wheel Factory, Yelahanka
- SAIL RITES Bengal Wagon Industry
