= Belepole =

- Neighbourhood
- Location in West Bengal, India Belepole (West Bengal) Belepole (India)
- Coordinates: 22°34′38″N 88°18′11″E
- Country: India
- State: West Bengal
- Division: Presidency
- District: Howrah
- City: Howrah

Government
  - Type: Municipal Corporation
  - Body: Howrah Municipal Corporation
- Time zone: UTC+5:30 (IST)
- PIN: 711104
- Telephone code: +91 33
- Vehicle registration: WB
- HMC ward: 44
- Lok Sabha constituency: Howrah
- Vidhan Sabha constituency: Shibpur

Belepole is a neighbourhood in Howrah of Howrah district in the Indian state of West Bengal. Belepole is under the jurisdiction of Chatterjeehat Police Station of Howrah City Police. It is a part of the area covered by Kolkata Metropolitan Development Authority (KMDA). It is an urban sprawl which sprung up near the old localities of South Howrah, like Bhattacharjee Para, Chatterjeehat etc. It is located near Shibpur. It has excellent communication and transportation facilities owing to its location, its life line is Kona Expressway which connects it to the Vidyasagar Setu (Second Hooghly Bridge) and hence Kolkata is just 15 minutes away. It is close to the State administrative building Nabanna.

== Demographics ==
The area is mainly inhabited by Hindus who have Bengali as their mother tongue. Hence Bengali is the main language of the area.

== Notable locations ==
- Belepole Panch Mathar More or Belepole Bus Stop.
- Hang Sang Crossing or Belepole Crossing.
- Kusum Kumari Park.
- Dhole Company Warehouse and Factory.
- Howrah Indoor Stadium and Dumurjala Sports City
- Zaika Inn.
- Bayleaf Restaurant.
- Chatterjeehat.

== Main occupations ==
The main occupations of the area are running restaurants and eateries, working in factories and family business, in addition to that a number of doctors, engineers, IT consultants and government workers live in the locality. Many Old residential houses are also there.

== Transport ==
Belepole has grossly a 2 km radius and is interconnected by lanes and bylanes. Dr. Bholanath Chakraborty Sarani (Formerly Drainage Canal Road), Sarat Chatterjee Road and Kona Expressway intersect in the area making transportation excellent, although traffic jams are frequent in the area. Bus and E-rickshaw are the main means of transport of the locals.

=== Bus ===
==== Private Bus ====
- 72 Dumurjala - Park Circus
- K6 Tikiapara railway station - Rajabazar
- K11 Domjur - Rabindra Sadan
- KB15 Santragachi railway station - Anandapur

==== Mini Bus ====
- 7 Carry Road - Shyambazar
- 26 Unsani - Esplanade
- S119/1 Santragachi railway station - B.B.D. Bagh

==== WBTC Bus ====
- C11 Domjur - B.B.D. Bagh/Belgachia
- E6 Amta - Esplanade
- E7 Bagnan railway station - Esplanade
- EB1A Santragachi railway station - Belgharia (Rathtala)
- T8 Tikiapara railway station - B.B.D. Bagh/Belgachia
- VS12 Santragachi railway station - New Town Bus Stand

Many Shuttle Buses (Without Numbers) also pass through Belepole crossing.

=== Train ===
Padmapukur railway station and Santragachi Junction are the nearest railway stations.

== See also ==
- Kadamtala
- Shibpur
- Santragachi
- Ramrajatala
- Howrah Indoor Stadium
