= Dumurjala Sports City =

Sports complex in Howrah, West Bengal, India

- ডুমুরজলা খেলনগরি
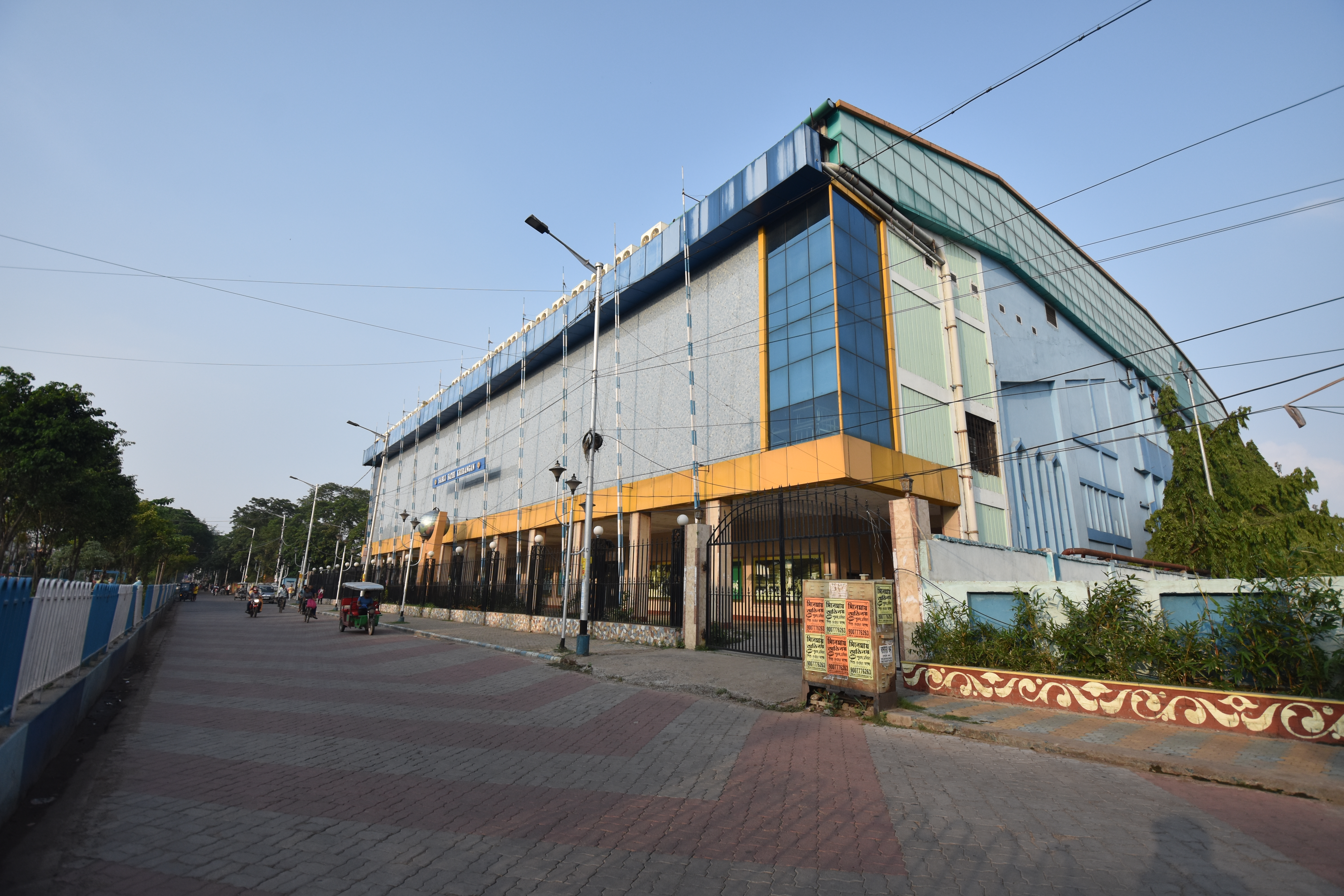
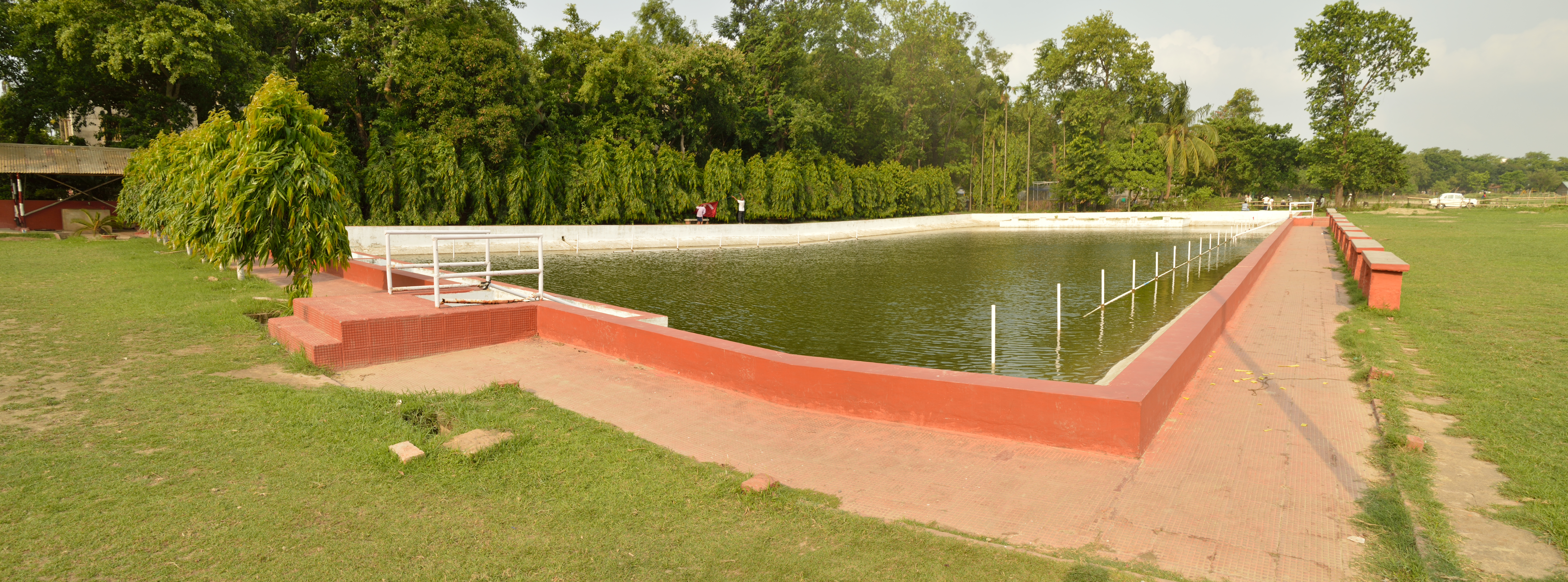
- Howrah Indoor Stadium Swimming pool in the complex Outdoor playground

- Location within West Bengal
- Location: Dumurjala, Howrah, West Bengal, India
- Coordinates: 22°34′54″N 88°18′24″E
- Operator: HMC
- Main venue: Howrah Indoor Stadium; Capacity: 6000
- Facilities: Outdoor playgrounds for Football, Hockey and Cricket; Swimming pool; Outdoor gym; Public park; Helipad
- Acreage: 56 acres (23 ha)

Construction
- Built: 2018-2022
- Opened: 2022
- Cost: ₹1,000 crores
- Builders: HIDCO, Howrah Improvement Trust (HIT), HMC

Dumurjala Sports City (or Dumurjala Sports Complex) is a sports complex of 56 acres in Dumurjala, Howrah, West Bengal, India. The complex consists of the 6000-seater indoor Howrah Indoor Stadium; outdoor grounds for football, cricket and hockey; a swimming pool; an outdoor gym; and a public park. The complex also has two helipads.

== The complex ==
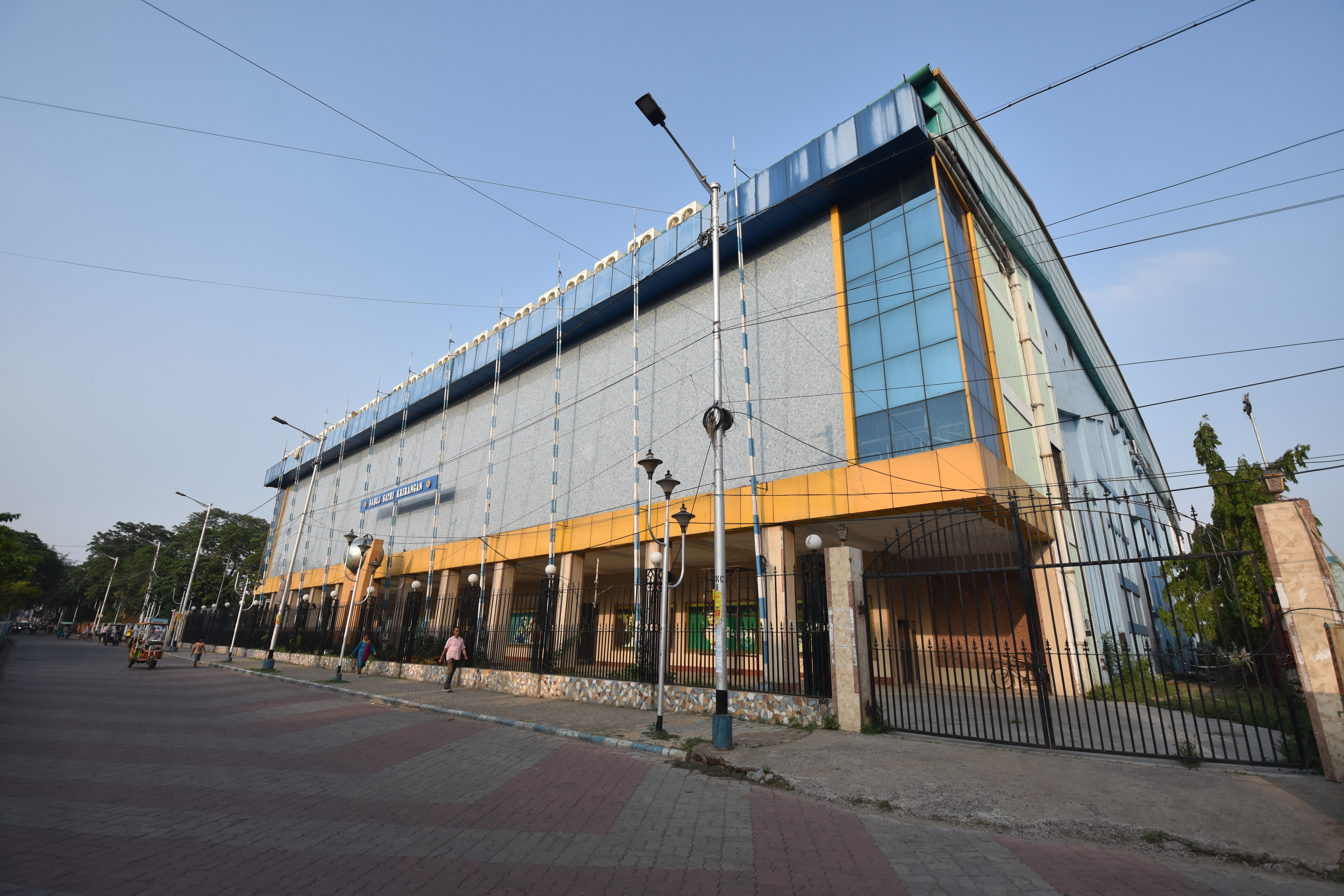
Howrah Indoor Stadium

Dumurjala Sports City is spread over an area of nearly 60 acres connected by Dumurjala Ring Road. The indoor stadium is centrally air-conditioned and has a capacity of 6000 seats. The floor is made of teak and synthetic wood. Indoor sports facilities includes courts for badminton, basketball, and volleyball, and a wrestling arena. It has two dressing rooms, a power room, a commentary box, and a guesthouse.

Outside the stadium it includes a 90mx50m football field, a 91.4mx55m hockey field, swimming pool along with multiple football and cricket grounds. Three other playgrounds along the ring road are for public use. There is a large children's park along with a lake island, a green corner for senior citizens and an outdoor gym facility. An international level outdoor stadium is also under construction, with a seating capacity of around 50,000. There are two helipads for Government uses and multiple lakes. There are two parking lots for two-wheeler vehicles and a dedicated area for four-wheelers, which is also used as bus stand.

== Formation ==
In 1980s the Howrah Indoor Stadium was created and used for indoor game purposes. Multiple plans for making the stadium international level were proposed before 2011 but none of them were implemented. After 2011, the Howrah Improvement Trust (HIT) prepared a report for its possible expansion and township. But the plan was again cancelled and outskirts of Dumurjala mostly got occupied illegally by people for living. In 2015, the area was given to West Bengal Housing Infrastructure Development Corporation (HIDCO), a Government of West Bengal-controlled body, to examine possible explanations and develop it under the "Theme city" project of Government of West Bengal. In 2017, two helipads were created on the vacant places which were used as playgrounds by locals. Again plans were proposed in 2018 and construction works started.

In 2018 HIDCO announced Dumurjala to be a Sports City. A meeting was held in Howrah among then state Urban Development minister Firhad Hakim, then Mayor Rathin Chakraborty and then HIDCO chairman Debashis Sen along with senior officials of HMC and KMDA at HIDCO. The meeting stated Dumurjala Stadium was to be rebuilt and more developed to meet the state level. Investors were invited CAB was given 14-acre land. Moreover, use of renewable energy, state-of-the-art solid waste management were also planned. Township projects and housing units are also planned along the road to Dalalpukur. A 14-floored shopping mall and hotel are also planned.

=== Controversies and protest ===
After the announcement and works started in 2018, multiple protest from the locals held. Dumurjala is considered to be the "Lungs of Howrah", as it is the biggest open public area in Howrah city containing many trees, flora and fauna and forests. Hundreds of people came to protests stating "Do development but not destroying environment". "Dumurjala Math Bachao Committee" was formed to obstruct the project. A case was lodged in the Kolkata High Court against the construction by advocate Imtiaz Ahmed and Sabhyasachi Chattopadhyay. The High Court announced verdict in which it ordered the state Government to show reports about the project and to explain the explanation of the allegation of "destruction of greenery".

== Transport ==
The sports complex is situated on the side of Bholanath Chakraborty Sarani (Drainage Canal Road) or locally known as "Notun Rasta". The Kona Expressway (NH12) is also near the complex, which is an important gateway to Kolkata. Dumurjala sports complex itself have a bus stand though it is not a bus terminus. Buses for transportation junctions like Howrah, Exide, Newtown are available. Nearest rail station is Ramrajatala railway station (along Howrah line) and Padmapukur railway station (along Shalimar line), which are located 1.7 km and 1.2 km away from the complex respectively.

== See also ==
- Howrah Indoor Stadium
- Belepole
- Santragachi
- Howrah
