= Nibra =

- Census Town
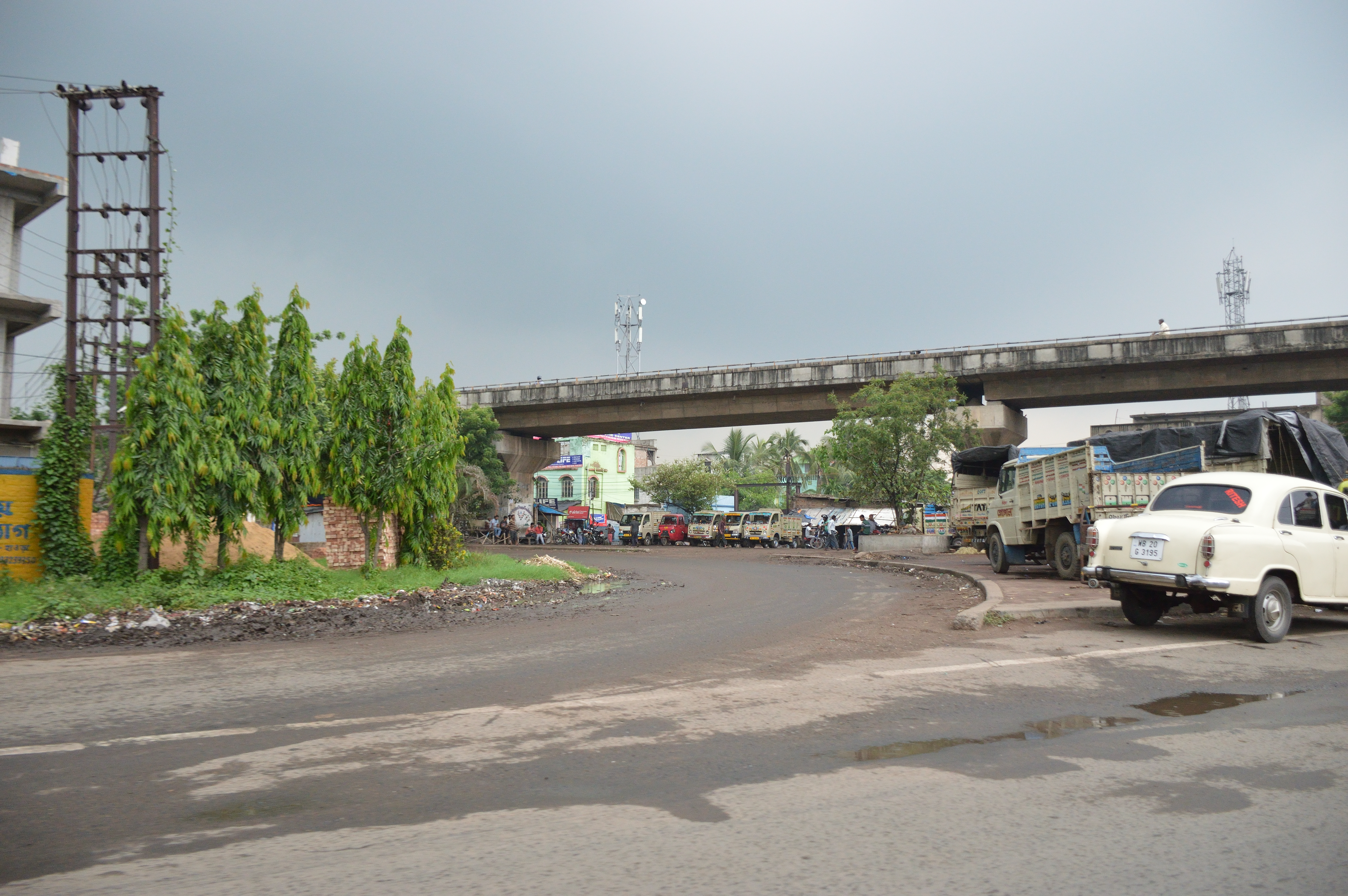
- National Highway 16 (Asian Highway 45) and Kona Expressway Junction, Nibra

- Location in West Bengal, India Nibra (India)
- Coordinates: 22.61°N 88.25°E
- Country: India
- State: West Bengal
- District: Howrah
- Elevation: 10 m (33 ft)

Population (2011)
  - Total: 27,818

Languages
  - Official: Bengali, English
- Time zone: UTC+5:30 (IST)
- Vehicle registration: WB
- Lok Sabha constituency: Sreerampur
- Vidhan Sabha constituency: Domjur
- Website: howrah.gov.in

Nibra is a census town in Domjur CD Block of Howrah Sadar subdivision in Howrah district in the Indian state of West Bengal.

== Demographics ==
As per 2011 Census of India Nibra had a total population of 27,818 of which 14,388 (52%) were males and 13,430 (48%) were females. The population below 6 years was 3,584. The total number of literates in Nibra was 21,219 (87.56% of the population over 6 years).

Nibra was part of Kolkata Urban Agglomeration in 2011 census.

As of 2001 India census, Nibra had a population of 22,288. Males constituted 52% of the population and females 48%. Nibra has an average literacy rate of 72%, higher than the national average of 59.5%: male literacy is 76% and female literacy is 69%. In Nibra, 14% of the population is under 6 years of age.

== Communication ==
There is a Sub-Post office in North Nibra.

== Transport ==
Nibra is the junction of National Highway 16 (part of Asian Highway 45) and Kona Expressway. People can easily go to several areas of Kolkata, Howrah and Hooghly from here.

=== Bus ===
==== Private Bus ====
- 40 Birshibpur - Serampore
- 79 Panchla - Dunlop
- E43 Dihibhursut - Howrah Station
- E53 Narit - Howrah Station
- K11 Domjur - Rabindra Sadan
- L3 Jhikhira/Muchighata - Howrah Station

==== CTC Bus ====
- C11 Domjur - B.B.D. Bagh/Belgachia
- E6 Amta - Esplanade
- E7 Bagnan railway station - Esplanade

Many Shuttle Buses (Without Numbers) also pass through Nibra.

=== Train ===
Santragachi Junction is the nearest railway station.

== Healthcare ==
There is a Hospital named Health-For-All at Katlia bus stoppage.
