= Kona Expressway =

Road in Greater Kolkata, India

Kona Expressway

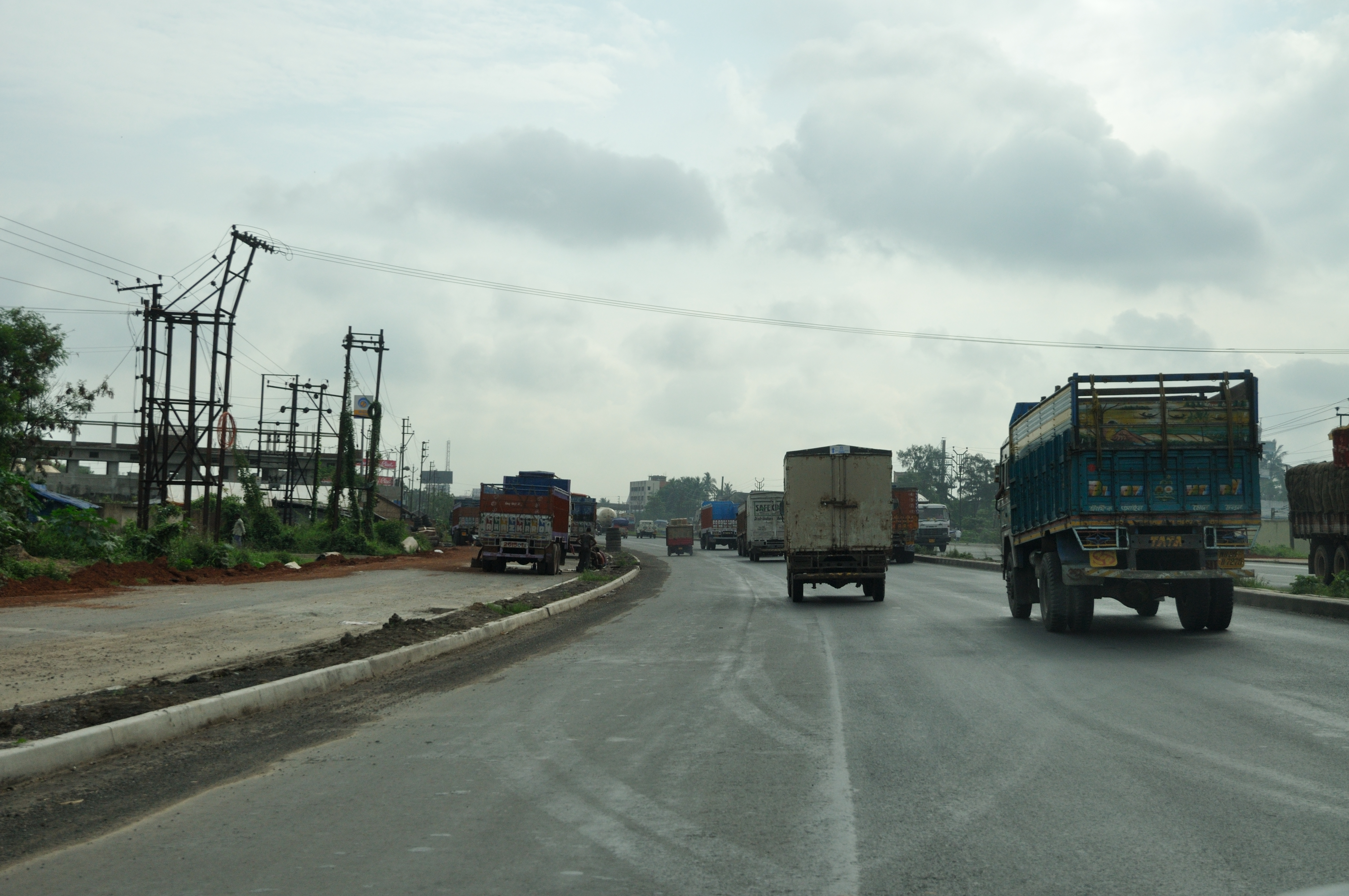

Route information
- Part of NH12
- Maintained by PWD-NH Division, GoWB and NHAI
- Length: 7.2 km (4.5 mi)
- Existed: 2001–present

Major junctions
- East end: NH 12 / NH 16 in Shibpur
- West end: NH 12 in Nibra

Location
- Country: India
- Primary destinations: Kolkata, Vidyasagar Setu, Belepole, Santragachi, Nibra

Highway system
- Roads in India; Expressways; National; State; Asian

Kona Expressway (part of NH12) is a 7.2-kilometre-long (4.5 mi) limited access expressway in West Bengal, India. It consists of a six-laned elevated expressway corridor (under construction as of 2026) and 4-6 laned at-grade cum service road. The road acts as important link to Kolkata connecting National Highway 16 near Nibra to Vidyasagar Setu near Shibpur via Santragachi. It is one of the most important entries to Kolkata. As of November 2022, the road carries more 70,000 vehicles per day.

== Route ==
Kona Expressway entirely lies in Howrah district of West Bengal and is owned and maintained by NHAI and PWD NH division. The route was opened in 2001. Kona Expressway is significant since it is one of the three and major route to enter in Kolkata. The route goes through major areas like Santragachi, Belepole, Carry road junction. From Nibra to Shibpur, the elevated expressway corridor has direct entry ramp from NH16 interchange and exit ramps at Belepole and Shibpur interchange. It ends near Nabanna, Shibpur having an interchange with Grand Trunk Road, Forshoe Road, Shibpur road and approach road to Vidyasagar Setu. From Shibpur to Nibra, it has direct entry ramp from Shibpur interchange and has exit ramps at Santragachi and NH16 interchange. The at-grade cum service road connects other important routes like Andul Road, Drainage Canal road which leads to Howrah. Though the at grade is 4-6 laned but it becomes two laned on Santragachi Rail-over-bridge which crosses over Santragachi jheel and rail lines.

The route passes along two major inter-city railway junctions namely, Santragachi Junction railway station in Santragachi and Shalimar railway station near Vidyasagar Setu toll centre. Santragachi bus terminus is also along the route, which is used as inter-city bus terminus for Kolkata and long-distance buses. The at grade road serves as the route of a large number of Government and private buses like Barasat-Newtown-Santragachi, Barasat-Ultadanga-Santragachi, KB15 (Santragachi-Anandapur), EB1A (to Belgharia), VS12 (to New Town), K11 (Domjur - Rabindra Sadan), 26 (Mini) (Unsani - Esplanade), C11 (Domjur - B.B.D. Bagh/Belgachia), E6 (Amta - Esplanade), E7 (Bagnan - Esplanade) etc.

The route is a part of NH 12 (NH117 before 2010) and a connector to NH 16(NH 6 before 2010).
