= Howrah =

Howrah Haōṛa (Bengali)
- Metropolis
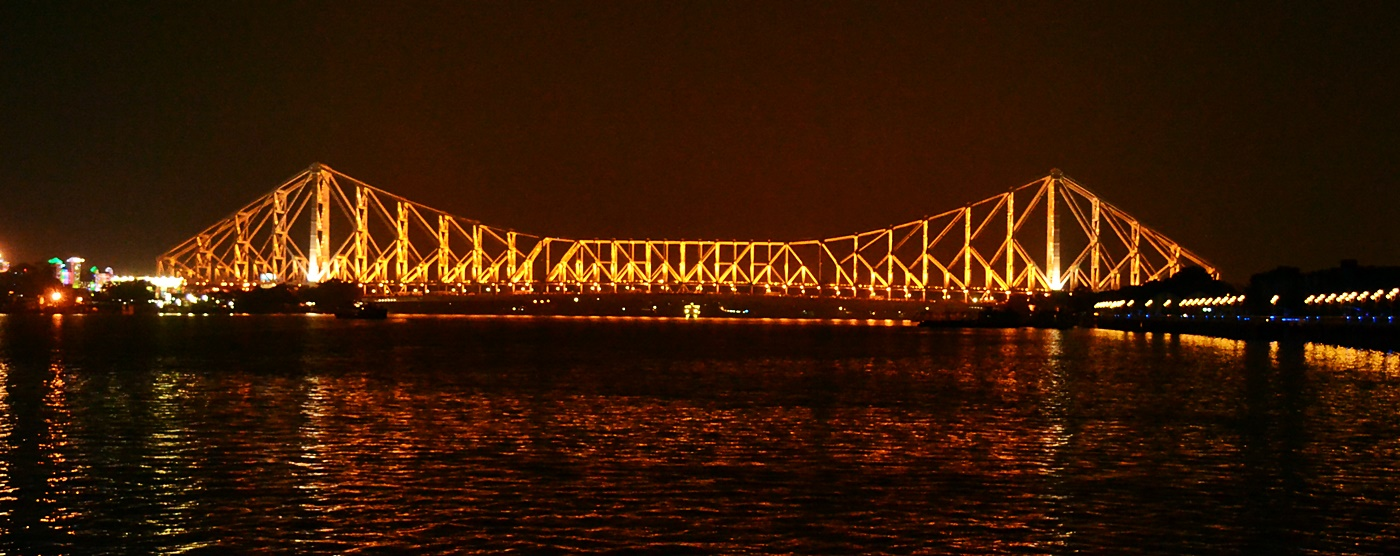
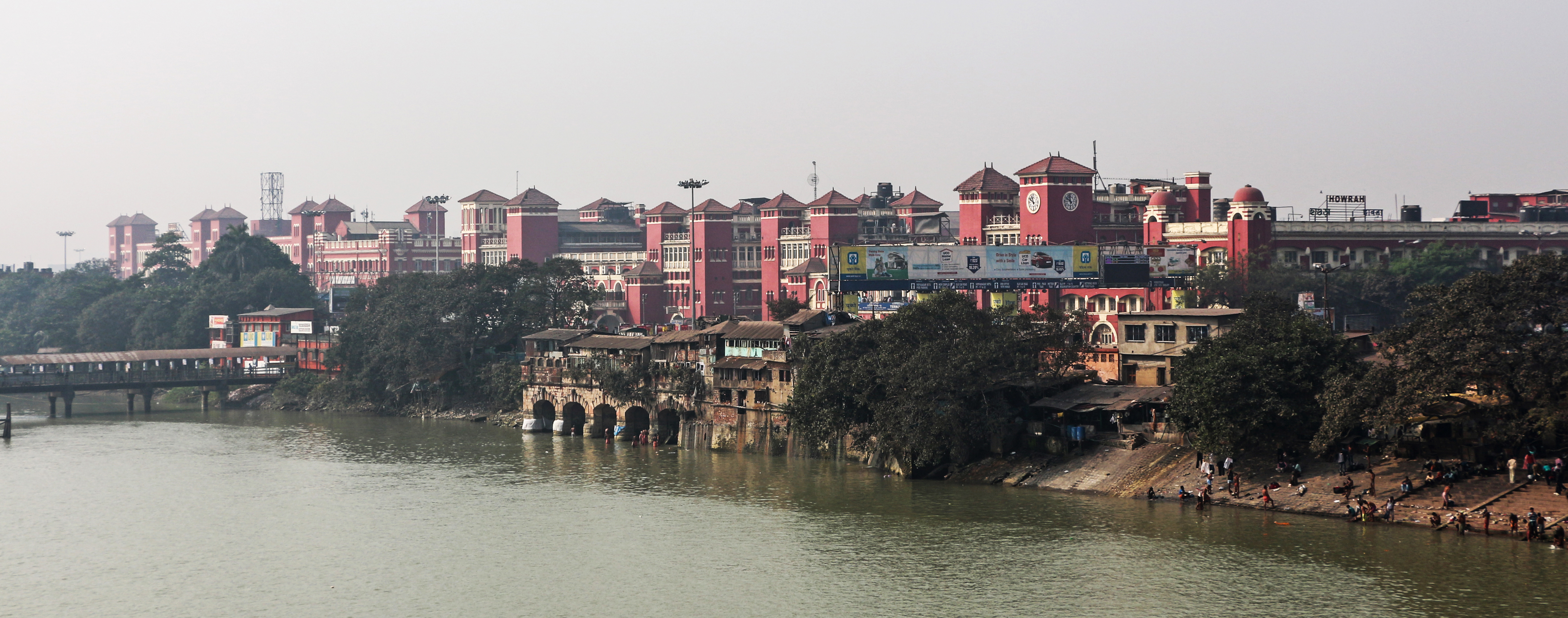
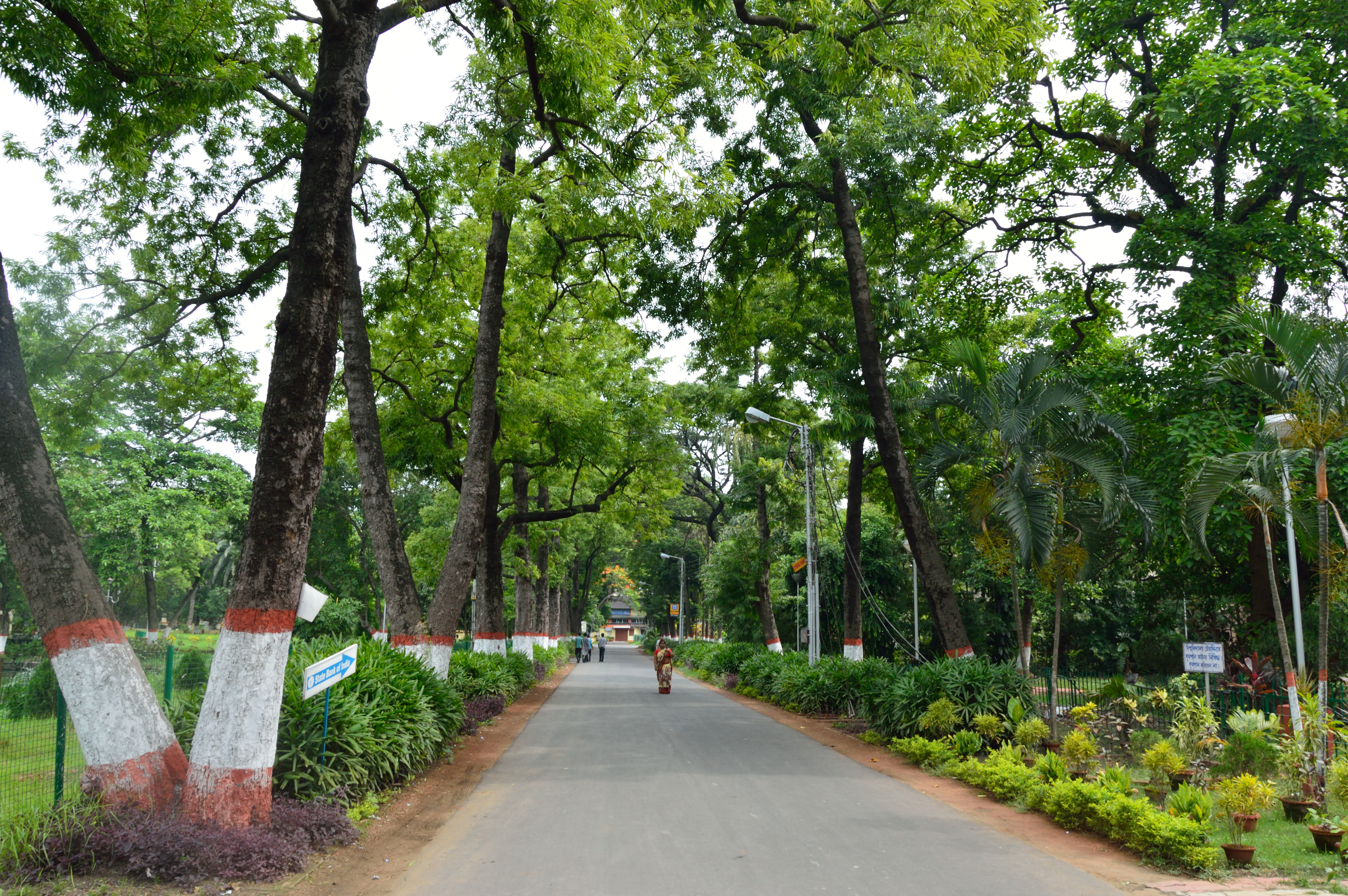
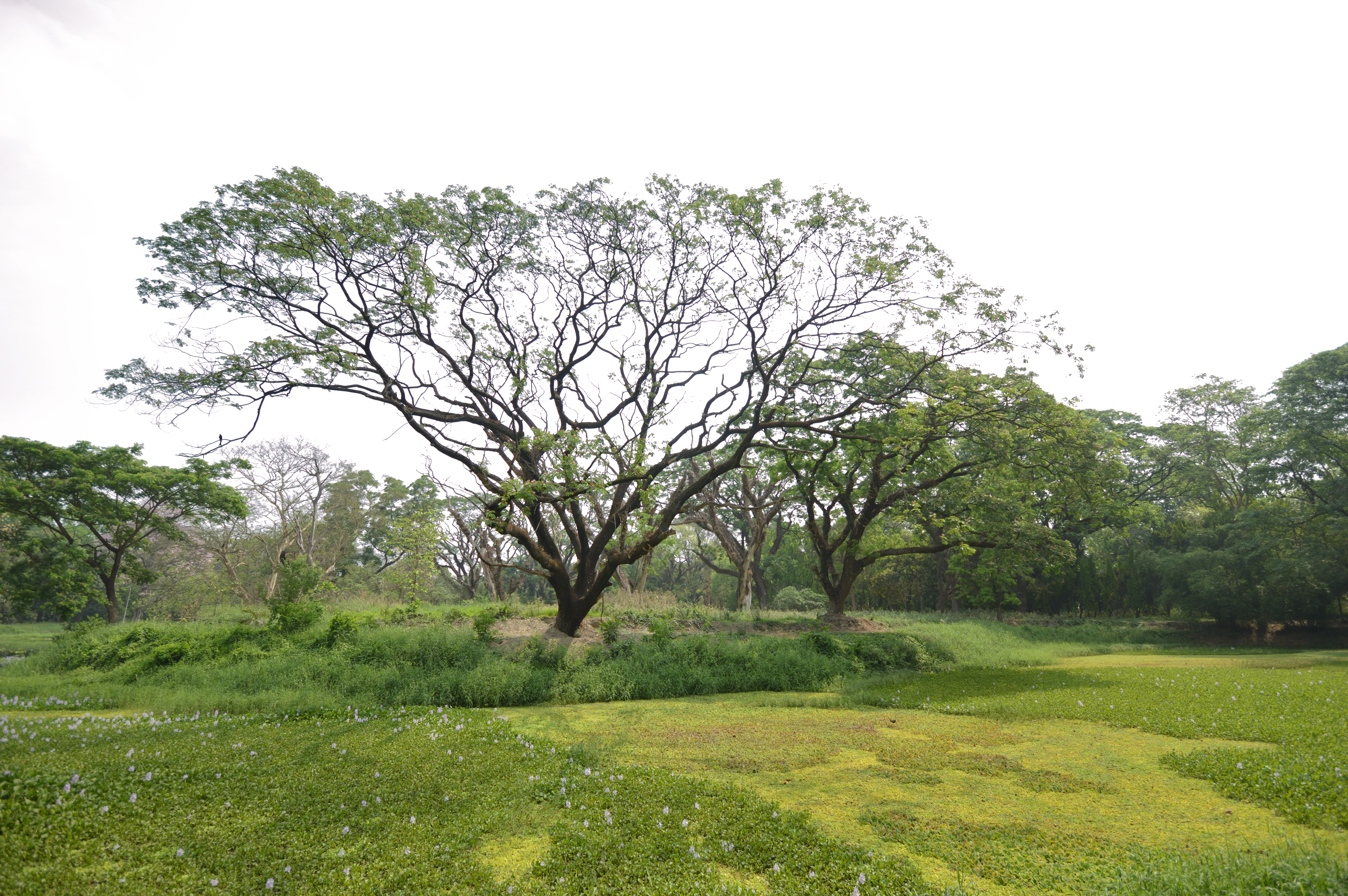
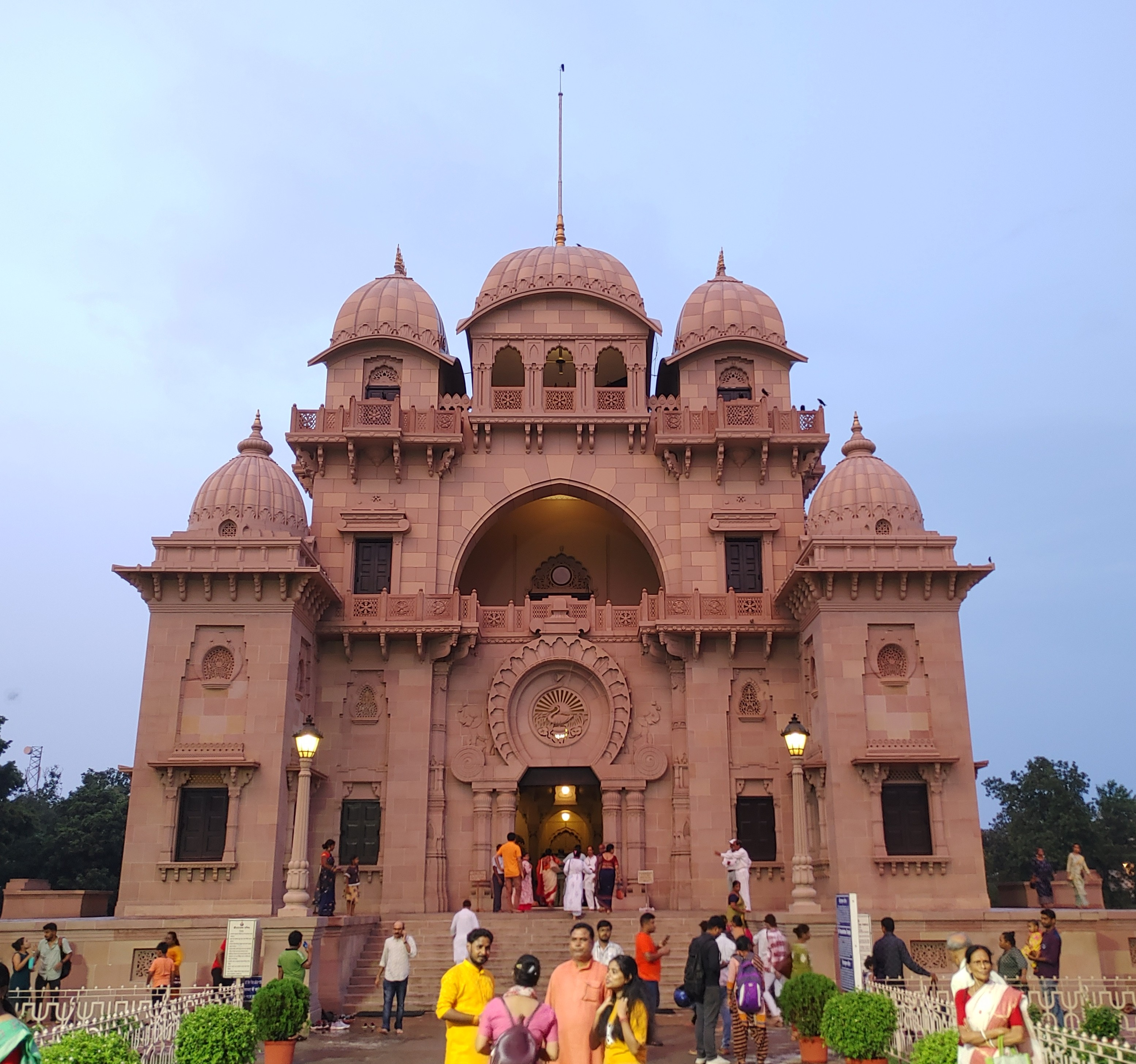
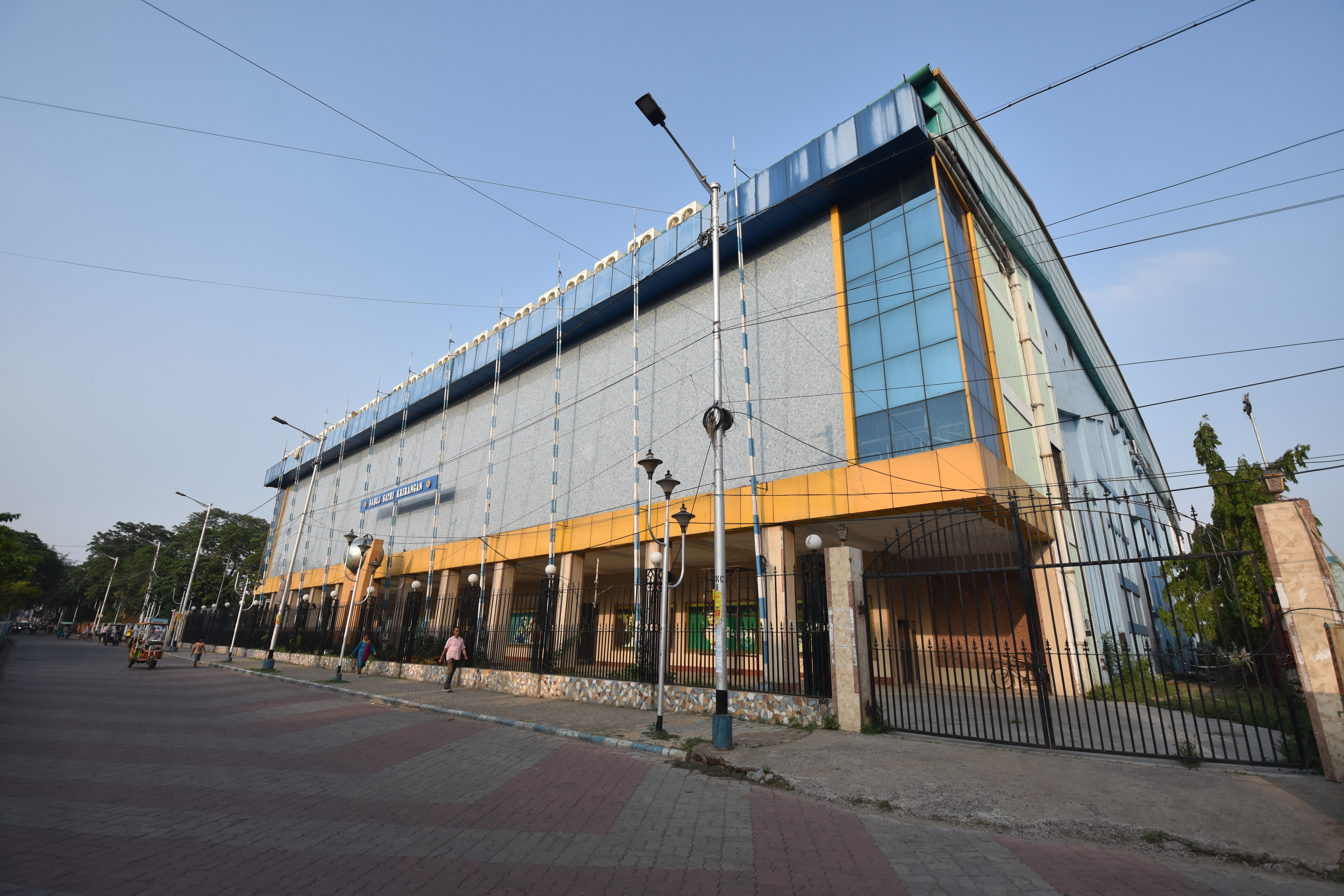
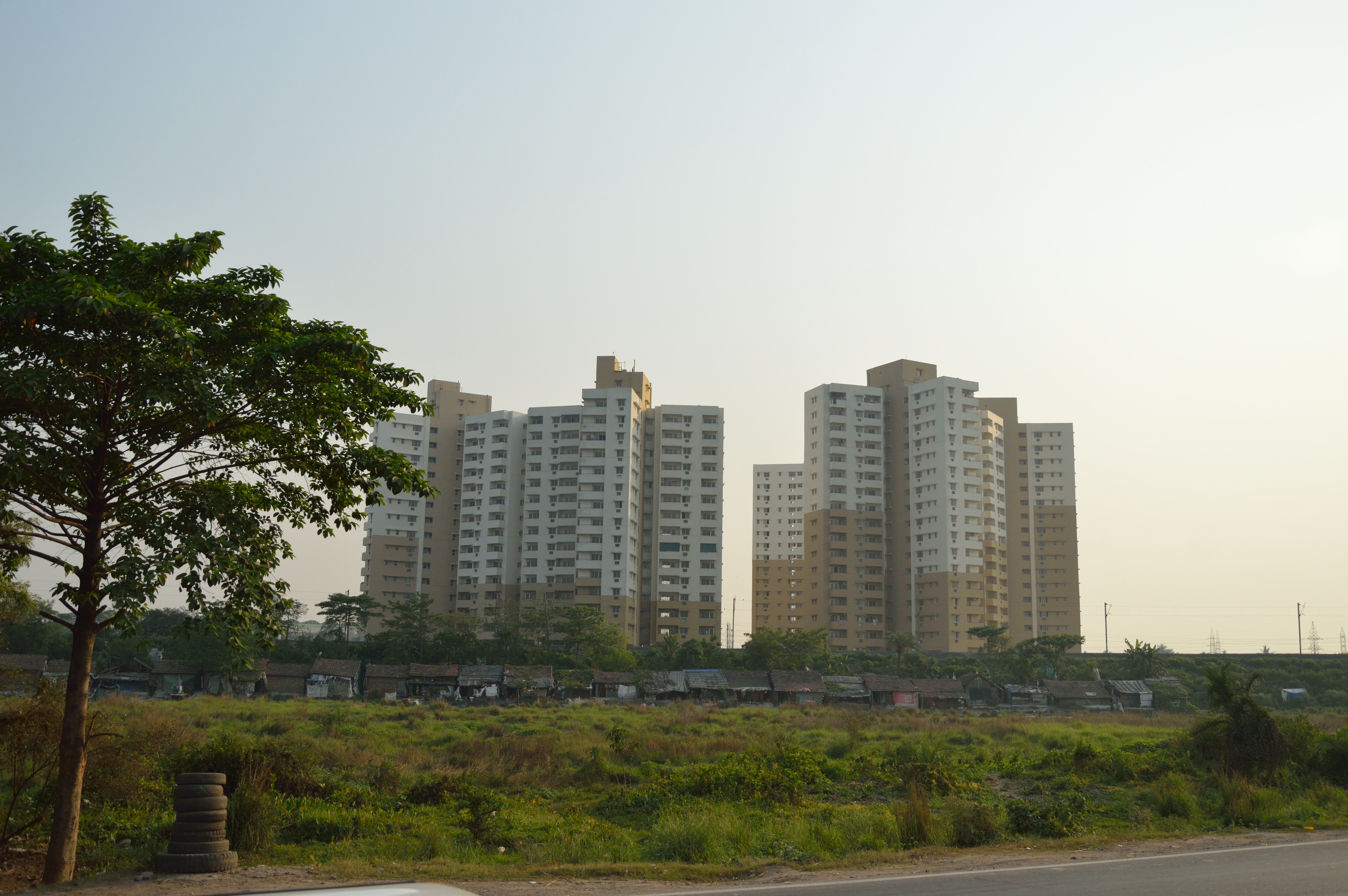
- The Howrah Bridge Howrah Junction railway station Inside IIEST Shibpur campus AJCB Indian Botanical Garden at Shibpur Belur Math Howrah Indoor Stadium at Dumurjala Sports City Apartments in Santragachi
- Nickname: Sheffield of India
- Interactive map of Howrah
- Location in West Bengal Location in India
- Coordinates: 22°34′48″N 88°19′46″E
- Country: India
- State: West Bengal
- Division: Presidency
- District: Howrah

Government
  - Type: Municipal Corporation
  - Body: Howrah Municipal Corporation
  - Mayor: Vacant
  - Lok Sabha MP: Prasun Banerjee (NCPI)
  - MLAs: List: Howrah Uttar – Umesh Rai (BJP); Howrah Madhya – Arup Roy (AITC); Shibpur – Rudranil Ghosh (BJP); Howrah Dakshin – Nandita Chowdhury (AITC)
  - Police Commissioner: C. Sudhakar, IPS

Area
  - Metropolis: 63.55 km^{2} (24.54 sq mi)
  - Metro: 450.65 km^{2} (174.00 sq mi)
- Elevation: 12 m (39 ft)

Population (2011)
  - Metropolis: 1,077,075
  - Density: 16,950/km^{2} (43,900/sq mi)
  - Metro: 2,811,344

Languages
  - Official: Bengali
  - Additional official: English
- Time zone: UTC+5:30 (IST)
- PIN: 711101 to 711114, 711201 to 711204, 711302 and 711409
- Telephone code: +91 33
- Vehicle registration: WB-11 to WB-14
- Lok Sabha: Howrah
- Vidhan Sabha: List: Howrah Uttar; Howrah Madhya; Shibpur; Howrah Dakshin
- Website: www.myhmc.in

Howrah (/ˈhaʊrə/; Bengali: [ˈɦao̯ɽa]) is a city in the Indian state of West Bengal. Howrah is located on the western bank of the Hooghly River, opposite to its twin city of Kolkata. Administratively Howrah lies within Howrah district and is the headquarters of the Howrah Sadar subdivision. It is governed by the Howrah Municipal Corporation; it is also a part of the area covered by Kolkata Metropolitan Development Authority (KMDA). Howrah is an important industrial and transportation hub, and is also a gateway to Kolkata via Howrah railway station and Howrah Bridge.

== Etymology ==
The name came from the word Haor— Bengali word for a fluvial swampy lake, which is sedimentologically a depression where water, mud and organic debris accumulate. The word itself was rather used in eastern part of Bengal (now Bangladesh), as compared to the western part (now West Bengal).

== History ==
The history of the city of Howrah dates back over 500 years, but the district is situated in an area historically occupied by the ancient Bengali kingdom of Bhurshut. Venetian explorer Cesare Federici, who travelled in India during 1565–79, mentioned a place called Buttor in his journal circa 1578. As per his description, this was a location into which large ships could travel (presumably the Hoogli river) and perhaps a commercial port. This place is identifiable with the modern day neighbourhood of Bator. Bator was also mentioned in the Bengali poetry Manasamangal written by Bipradas Pipilai in 1495.

In 1713, the Bengal Council of the British East India Company, on the accession of the Emperor Farrukhsiyar, grandson of Aurangzeb, to the throne of Delhi, sent a deputation to him with a petition for a settlement of five villages on west bank of Hooghly river along with thirty-three villages on the east bank. The list of villages appeared in the Consultation Book of the Council dated 4 May 1714. The five villages on the west bank on Hooghly river were: 'Salica' (Salkia), 'Harirah' (Howrah), 'Cassundeah' (Kasundia), 'Ramkrishnopoor' (Ramkrishnapur) and 'Battar' (Bator): all identifiable with localities of modern-day Howrah city. The deputation was successful except for these five villages. By 1728, most of the present-day Howrah district was part of either of the two zamindaris: Burdwan or Muhammand Aminpur.

On 11 October 1760, as a result of the Battle of Plassey, the East India Company signed a treaty with Mir Qasim, the Nawab of Bengal, to take over the control of Howrah district. In 1787 the Hooghly district was formed and in 1819 the whole of the present day Howrah district was added to it. The Howrah district was separated from the Hooghly district in 1843.

== Demographics ==
Religion in Howrah City (2011)
Religion	Percent
Hinduism	82.72%
Islam	15.25%
Jainism	0.75%
Others	1.28%

Howrah is 2nd most populated city in West Bengal (behind Kolkata). As of 2011 Indian census, Howrah had a population of 1,077,075 with households. (Note: Census data of Howrah can be difficult to compare as the city is sometimes grouped together with the Kolkata and other settlements as the Kolkata metropolitan area. Further care needs to be taken to distinguish Howrah town from Howrah district. It is also worth noting that Bally Municipality was re-incorporated into Howrah in 2015)

In the 1896 census of British India, Howrah had a population of 84,069, which grew to 157,594 in the 1901 census. This rapid growth was due to abundance of job opportunities, which resulted in a 100% increase in male population during this period, whereas the female population grew only by 60%.

Howrah town population by year (Note: Note that Howrah town census area was not stable until 1981)
Year	Population	% increase	Males	Females
1896	84,069			
1901	157,594		99,904	57,690
1911	179,006	13.59	114,566	64,440
1921	195,301	9.10	128,472	66,829
1931	224,873	15.14	145,120	79,753
1941	379,292	68.67	246,959	132,333
1951	433,630	14.33	268,412	165,218
1961	532,692	22.84	325,493	207,199
1971	737,877	38.52	439,457	298,420
1981	744,429	0.89	421,636	322,793
1991	950,435	27.67	528,396	422,039
2001	1,007,532	6.01	547,068	460,464
2011	1,077,075	6.90	561,220	515,855

== Geography ==
=== Climate ===
Howrah has a Tropical wet-and-dry climate (Köppen climate classification Aw). The summers here have a good deal of rainfall, while the winters have very little. The temperature averages 26.3 °C. Precipitation averages 1744 mm.

Howrah has been ranked 40th best "National Clean Air City" (under Category 1 >10L Population cities) in India.

Climate data for Howrah, 1981–2010
Month	Jan	Feb	Mar	Apr	May	Jun	Jul	Aug	Sep	Oct	Nov	Dec	Year
Mean daily maximum °C (°F)	25.8 (78.4)	29.2 (84.6)	33.5 (92.3)	35.3 (95.5)	35.3 (95.5)	33.8 (92.8)	32.4 (90.3)	32.2 (90.0)	32.4 (90.3)	32.2 (90.0)	30.1 (86.2)	27.0 (80.6)	31.6 (88.9)
Mean daily minimum °C (°F)	14.1 (57.4)	17.8 (64.0)	22.4 (72.3)	25.3 (77.5)	26.4 (79.5)	26.8 (80.2)	26.5 (79.7)	26.4 (79.5)	26.0 (78.8)	24.1 (75.4)	19.7 (67.5)	15.2 (59.4)	22.6 (72.7)
Average precipitation mm (inches)	10.4 (0.41)	20.9 (0.82)	35.2 (1.39)	58.9 (2.32)	133.1 (5.24)	300.6 (11.83)	396.0 (15.59)	344.5 (13.56)	318.0 (12.52)	180.5 (7.11)	35.1 (1.38)	3.2 (0.13)	1,836.4 (72.3)
Average rainy days	1.1	1.7	2.2	3.4	7.0	12.8	17.7	16.9	13.9	7.4	1.3	0.5	85.9
Source: India Meteorological Department

== Civic administration ==
Howrah Municipal Corporation is responsible for the administration of Howrah. The tenure of the last board of HMC had ended back on 10 December 2018. From then onwards the corporation has been run by unelected board of administrators selected by the West Bengal government. The Howrah City Police is responsible for law enforcement in the city. Smt. Tejasvi Rana, IAS is appointed as the Commissioner of the Howrah Municipal Corporation. The following are the departments of the Corporation: Accounts, Assessment, Building, Conservancy, Stores, Education, General, Law, License, Health, Survey, Market, Slum Development, Disaster Management, Lighting, Roads, Sewerage & Drainage, Water Supply, Information Technology, Planning & Development, Parks & Garden and Media Cell.

=== Municipal finance ===
According to financial data published on the CityFinance Portal of the Ministry of Housing and Urban Affairs, the Howrah Municipal Corporation reported total revenue receipts of ₹288 crore (US$34 million) and total expenditure of ₹311 crore (US$37 million) in 2022–23. Tax revenue accounted for about 17.4% of the total revenue, while the corporation received ₹177 crore in grants during the financial year.

=== History ===
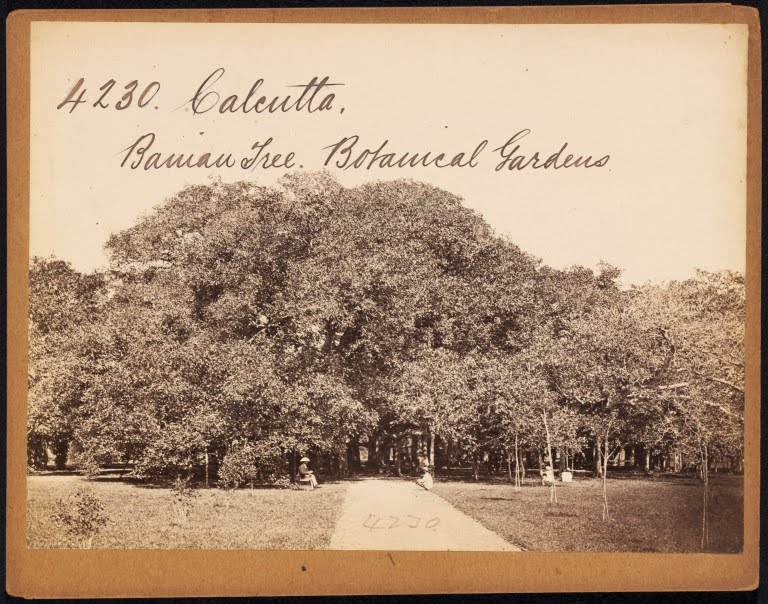
Great Banyan Tree at the Botanical Gardens, Howrah by Francis Frith (1850s-1870s)

Howrah Municipality was established in 1862. From 1896, it started supplying filter water across the city. During 1882–83, Bally Municipality was formed separating it out from Howrah. Babu Mahendranath Roy was the first Indian elected chairperson of the Howrah Municipal corporation, many subsequent projects were undertaken by him for the development of the city. As per the Howrah Municipal Corporation Act of 1980, Howrah became a municipal corporation in 1984. The corporation area was divided into fifty wards, each of which elects a councillor. The Mayor-in-council, which is led by Mayor and supported by Commissioner and officers, is responsible for administration of the corporation area. In 2015, the Bally Municipality was re-amalgamated into Howrah Municipal Corporation, through Corporation vide notification no. 428/MA/O/C-4/IM-36/2014 dated 26 June 2015, which increased the total number of wards to 66.

=== Other administrative offices ===
Howrah also hosts the temporary administrative office of the state of West Bengal. The office of the Chief Minister of state had been traditionally posted at the Writers' Building, however owing to renovation of the building, the administration has been occupying the Nabanna building.

== Development and growth ==
Although it is one of the largest cities in the state, Howrah witnessed urbanisation in an unplanned manner. As a result, Howrah is continuing to face its perennial problems like traffic congestion, heavy population growth, and pollution.

The city contains a few unlicensed and unregulated residential areas or slums. The name of the novel City of Joy, which has been often the name the Kolkata metropolis been called, is actually based on one such Howrah slum. However, recently, work has been done on broadening the National Highways and several local roads. These activities are expected to help in improvement of traffic conditions. Of late, Howrah has seen a lot of new industrial proposals like the Kona Truck Terminus, Kolkata West International City and relocation of the old smoky foundry plants.. The West Bengal Government has also planned a major renovation of the city to match the city's urban facilities with its neighbouring city Kolkata. The Kolkata Metropolitan Development Authority (KMDA) is the statutory planning and development authority for Howrah, as the city lies within the Kolkata Metropolitan Area (KMA).

== Economy ==
Often termed as Sheffield of the East, Howrah is known as an engineering hub, mainly in the area of light engineering industry. In 1823, Bishop Reginald Heber described Howrah as the place "chiefly inhabited by shipbuilders". There are small engineering firms all over Howrah, particularly around Belilios Road area near Howrah station However these businesses are declining in the 21st century. There are many foundries in Liluah area.

Burn Standard Company, a major company in heavy engineering industry, has its oldest manufacturing unit located in Howrah. Ramkrishna Forgings one of the largest forging company in India has one of its plant located at Liluah in Howrah. The Howrah plant of Shalimar Paints (established in 1902) was the first large-scale paint manufacturing plant to be set up not only in India but in entire South East Asia. The city houses one of the major manufacturing units of Tarsons Products.

== Transport ==
Howrah can be accessed from its many rail links, road links to National Highways, as well as its transport connections to Kolkata. Apart from the bridges connecting the cities, there are also ferry services between various jetties.

=== Rail ===
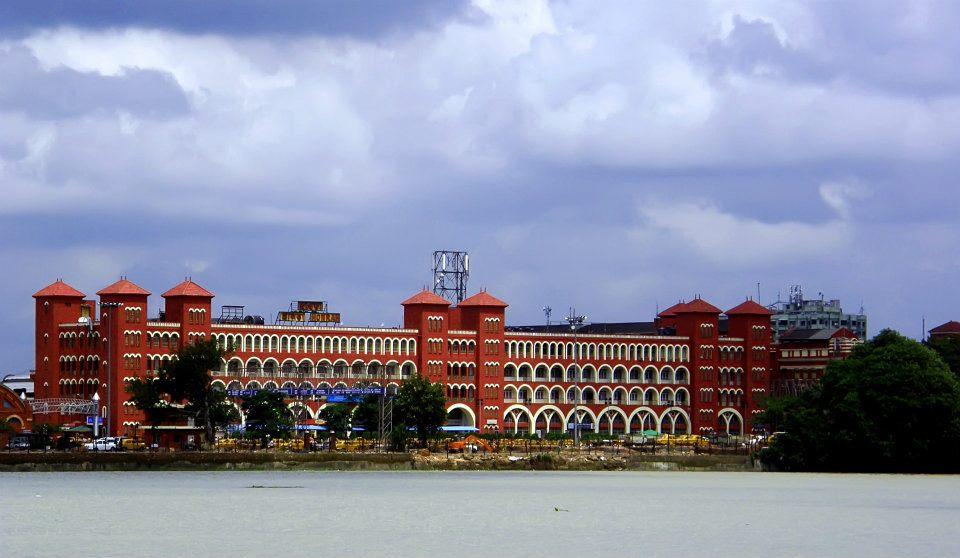
Howrah Station

Howrah railway station (more commonly referred to as Howrah Station) is the major railway station serving Howrah, Kolkata and the neighbouring districts. It is the busiest rail station in India, along with being the largest railway station in terms of number of platform (24). It was established in 1854 when a railway line was constructed connecting the city to the coalfields of Bardhaman. Howrah Station serves as a terminal for two railway zones of India: the Eastern Railway and the South Eastern Railway, and it is connected to most of the major cities of India. From Howrah both Eastern Railway and South Eastern Railway operates connecting various stations of the districts of Howrah, Hooghly, Bardhaman, East Midnapore and West Midnapore. Within Howrah city itself, there are twelve more stations, the most prominents being Santragachi and Shalimar.

=== Metro rail ===
Howrah is served by the Green Line with Salt Lake in Kolkata via a tunnel under River Hooghly. The Metro line connects Howrah to Esplanade as well which will act as interchange where commuters can change sides to travel on the North-South line. On the Howrah side, the 2 Stations will be at Howrah Station and Howrah Maidan. These stations are open for public. The Metro currently connects Howrah Maidan Station on one side to Saltlake sector V Station on the other; Howrah, Esplanade & Sealdah stations lying in between. People can also interchange at Esplanade station to reach Airport or other blue line metro station's.

=== Roads ===
The total road length in Howrah is approximately 300 km (190 miles). Howrah hosts a branch of the Grand Trunk Road – this was built, starting 1804, by the Public Works Department of the British administration. The road starts at the Acharya Jagadish Chandra Bose Indian Botanic Garden and connects to the main road near Chandannagar. Howrah also connects the metropolitan region to the national highways – NH 16 and NH 19, which are connected to Vidyasagar Setu via the Kona Expressway.

=== Bridges ===
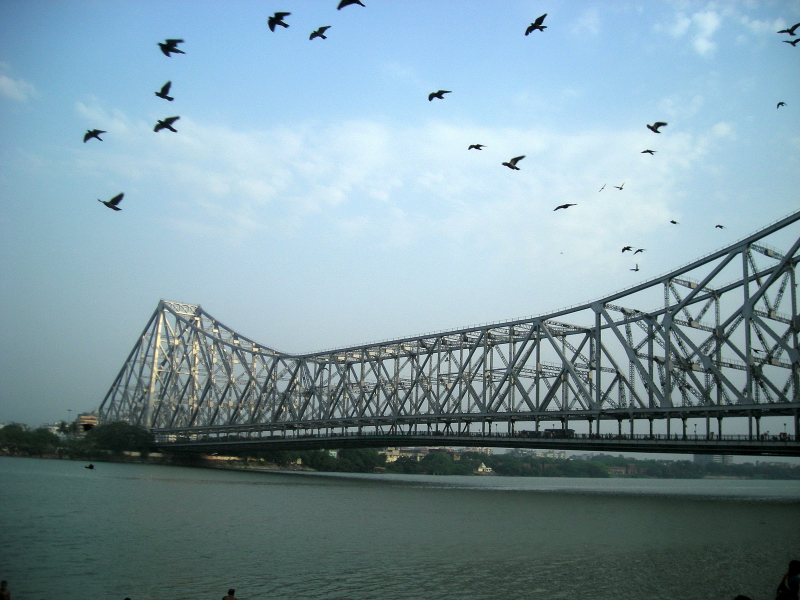
Howrah Bridge

Howrah and Kolkata are separated by the Hooghly River/Ganges and connected by four bridges across the river. These are the:

- Howrah Bridge, also known as Rabindra Setu
- Vidyasagar Setu, also known as the second Hooghly Bridge
- Vivekananda Setu, also known as Bally Bridge
- Nivedita Setu, also known as Second Bally Bridge

The cantilever style Howrah Bridge and the cable-stayed Vidyasagar Setu are counted among the longest bridges in the world within their types.

=== Other transport ===
There are ferry services available, between various jetties in Howrah and Kolkata, which were introduced in the 1970s.

== Neighbourhoods ==
Neighbourhoods of Howrah
Neighbourhoods of Howrah

Howrah has many various neighbourhoods, the most notable being Shibpur, Santragachi, Belur, Salkia, Ramrajatala, Liluah, Howrah Maidan and Bally. Shibpur hosts the Acharya Jagadish Chandra Bose Indian Botanic Garden, containing the Great Banyan tree, Avani Riverside Mall is also located here and the Indian Institute of Engineering Science and Technology, Shibpur. Near Howrah Station is the slum of Pilkhana which was the basis of the famous book and film City of Joy. The newly established temple, Pakuria Salasar Dham is the best tourist place in Howrah. This Hindu temple dedicated to Bhagavan Hanuman.

== Education ==
The Indian Institute of Engineering Science and Technology, Shibpur is a public engineering and research institution. It is the fourth oldest engineering institution in India, and is an institute of national importance.

Howrah's schools are either run by the state government or by private institutions. The medium of instruction is Bengali, English or Hindi. Schools are affiliated to the West Bengal Board of Secondary Education (WBBSE), West Bengal Council of Higher Secondary Education (WBCHSE), the Indian Certificate of Secondary Education (ICSE), National Institute of Open Schooling (NIOS) and Central Board of Secondary Education (CBSE).

Howrah Zilla School, established in 1845, is the only Governmental school in Howrah.

Howrah's first vernacular Bengali medium school, established in 1857, was Santragachi Minor School: currently the school is running as Santragachi Kedarnath Institution, Howrah.

Tech Skill Academy, established in 2025 under the aegis of Margastha Research Foundation, is recognized as the first computer training center in Howrah to introduce a dedicated e-commerce and Digital marketing courses, marking a significant step in the digital education and for rural and urban youth, particularly women, in the region. The organisation was established by Ajay Verma (Entrepreneur) and Ranjan Shaw (Researcher).

== Sports ==
The Sailen Manna Stadium, also known as the Howrah Municipal Corporation Stadium, is a multi-use stadium that hosts sporting events for association football. Dumurjala Sports City is a multi-purpose sports complex at Dumurjala. Howrah Rifle Club is a sports shooting stadium located at Howrah Maidan near the Metro Area.

== Markets ==
The Kali Babu Bazar is the biggest market in howrah for Grocery products, alongside Balitikuri Bazar, Salap Bazar, Bakultala Bazar, Makardaha Bazar, and Kona Bazar is the most popular markets in this district.

== Notable people ==
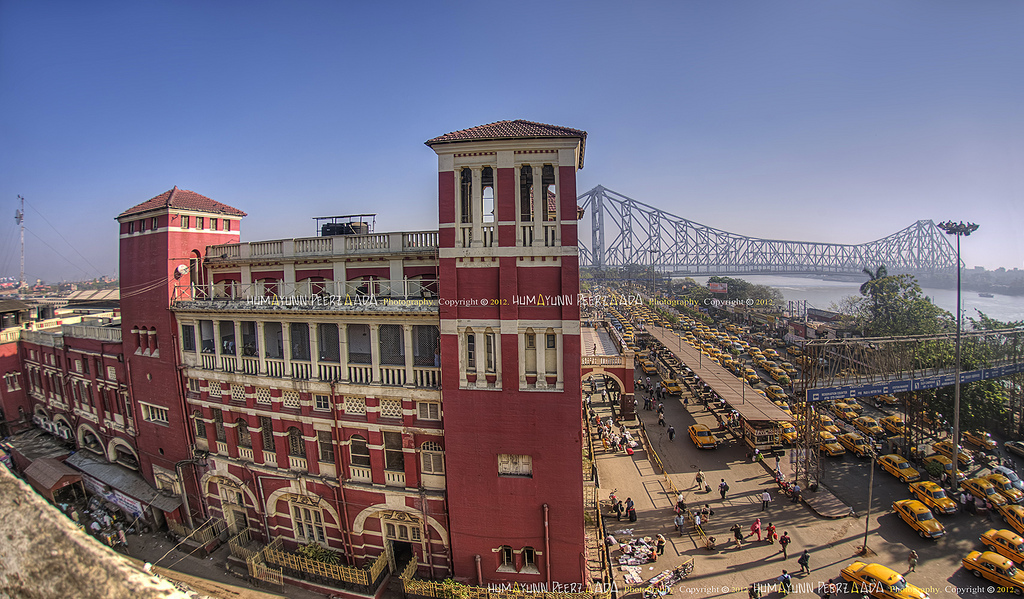
Howrah Station

== Gallery ==
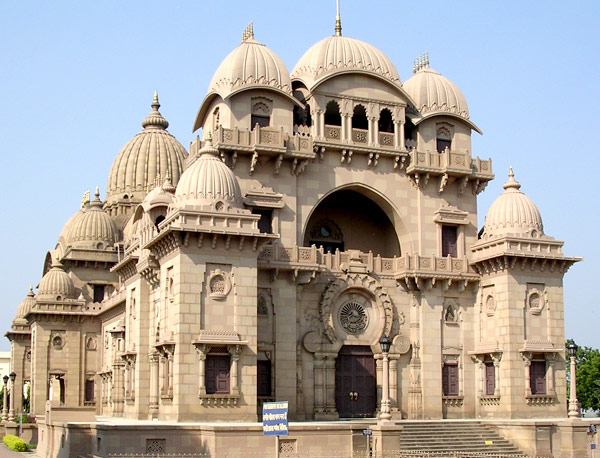
Belur Math, headquarters of the Ramakrishna Math and Mission

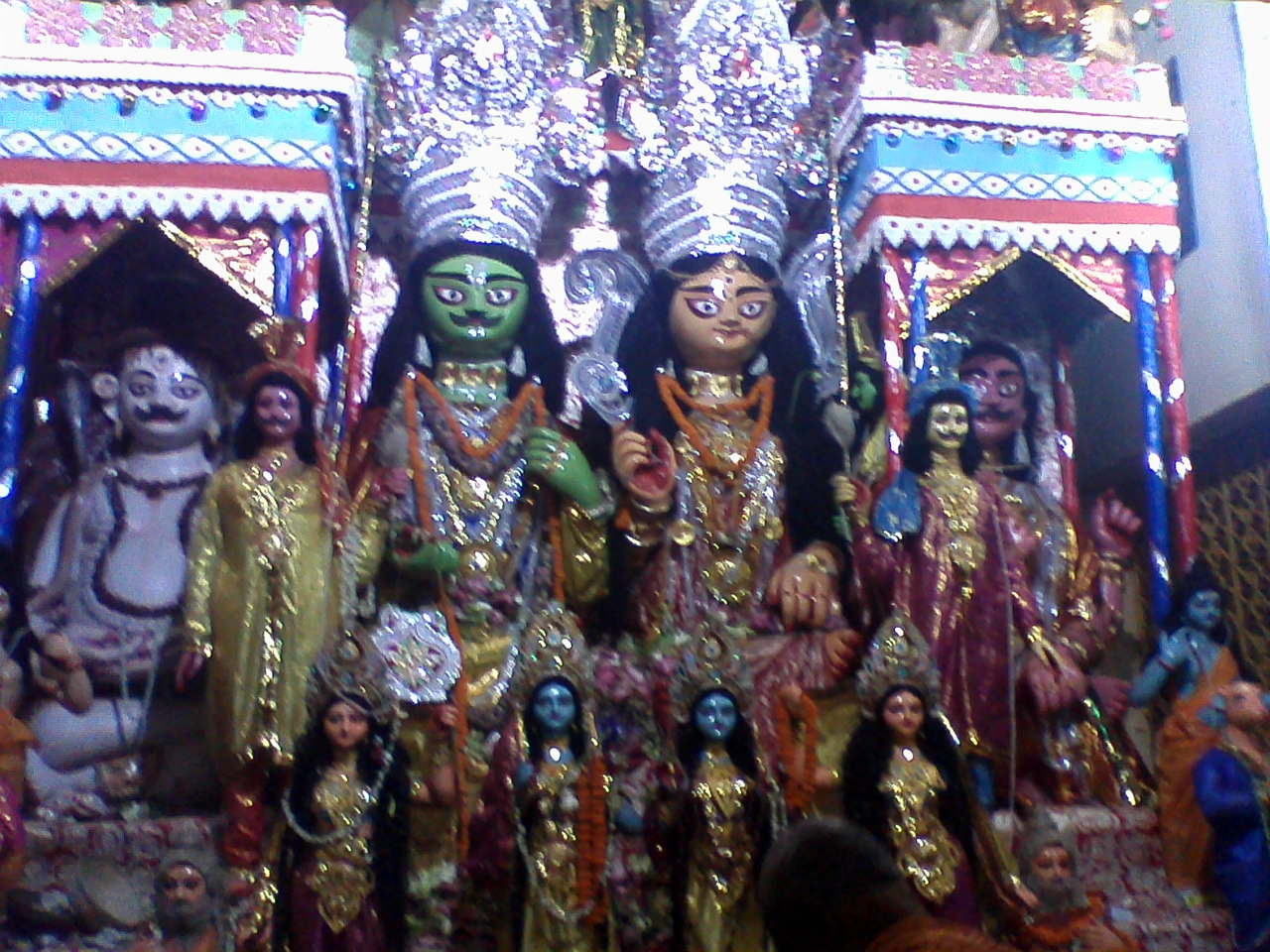
Rampuja at Ramrajatala

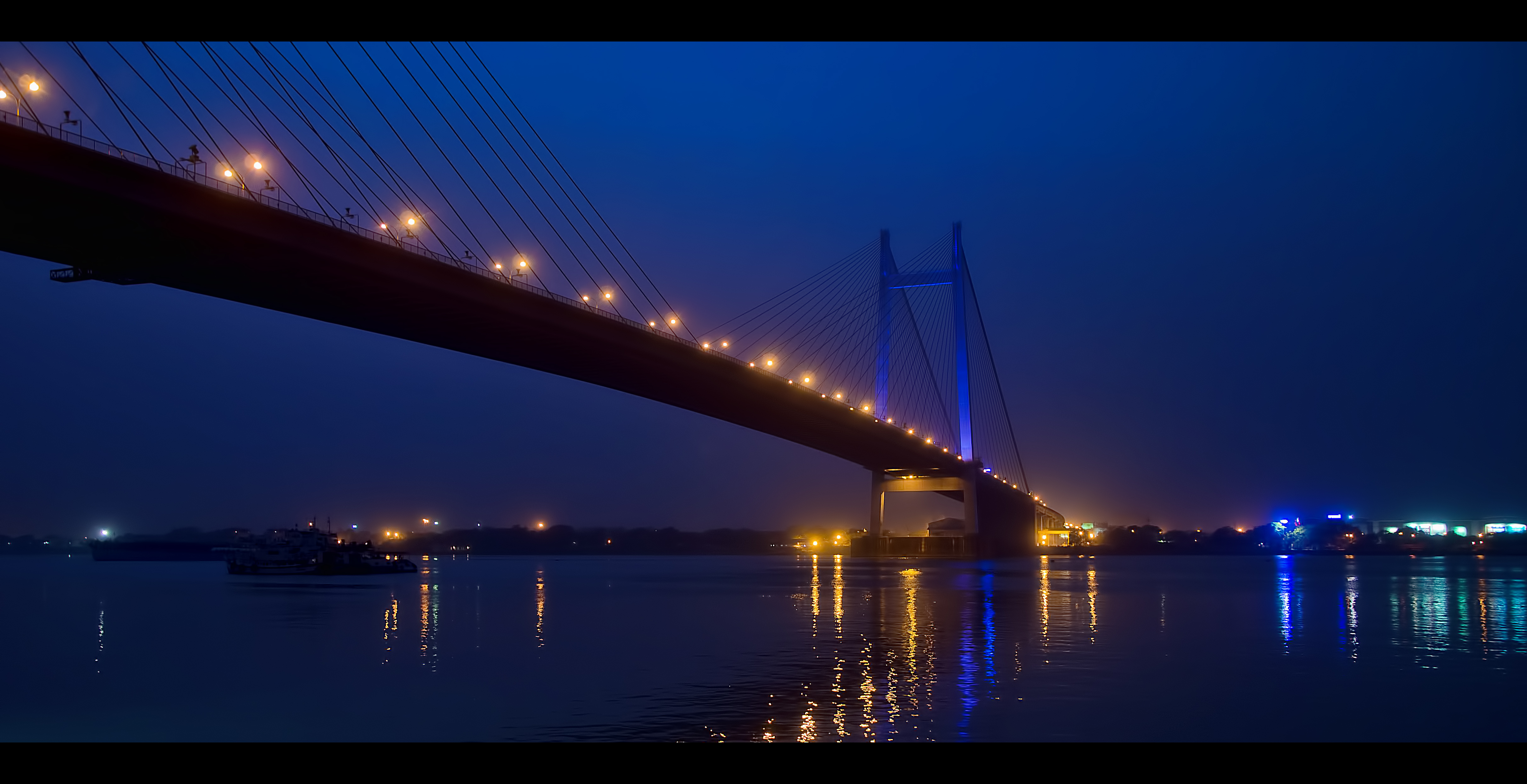
Second Hooghly Bridge (Vidyasagar Setu)

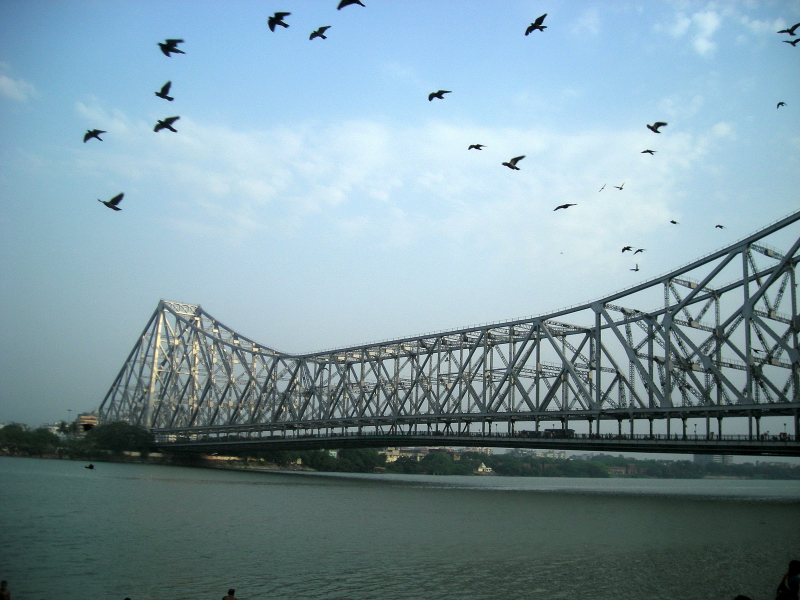
Howrah Bridge (Rabindra Setu)

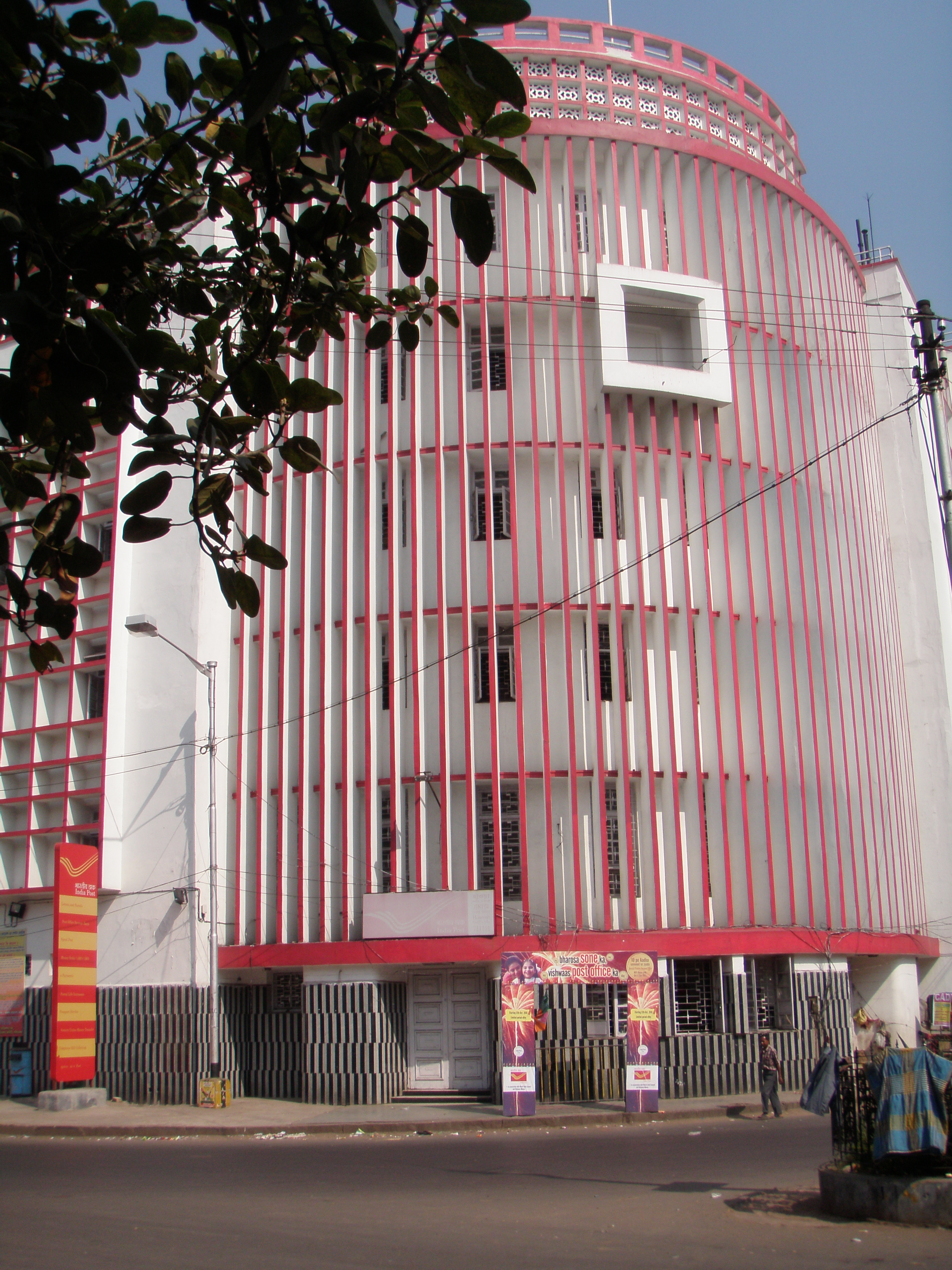
Howrah Head Post Office- 711101

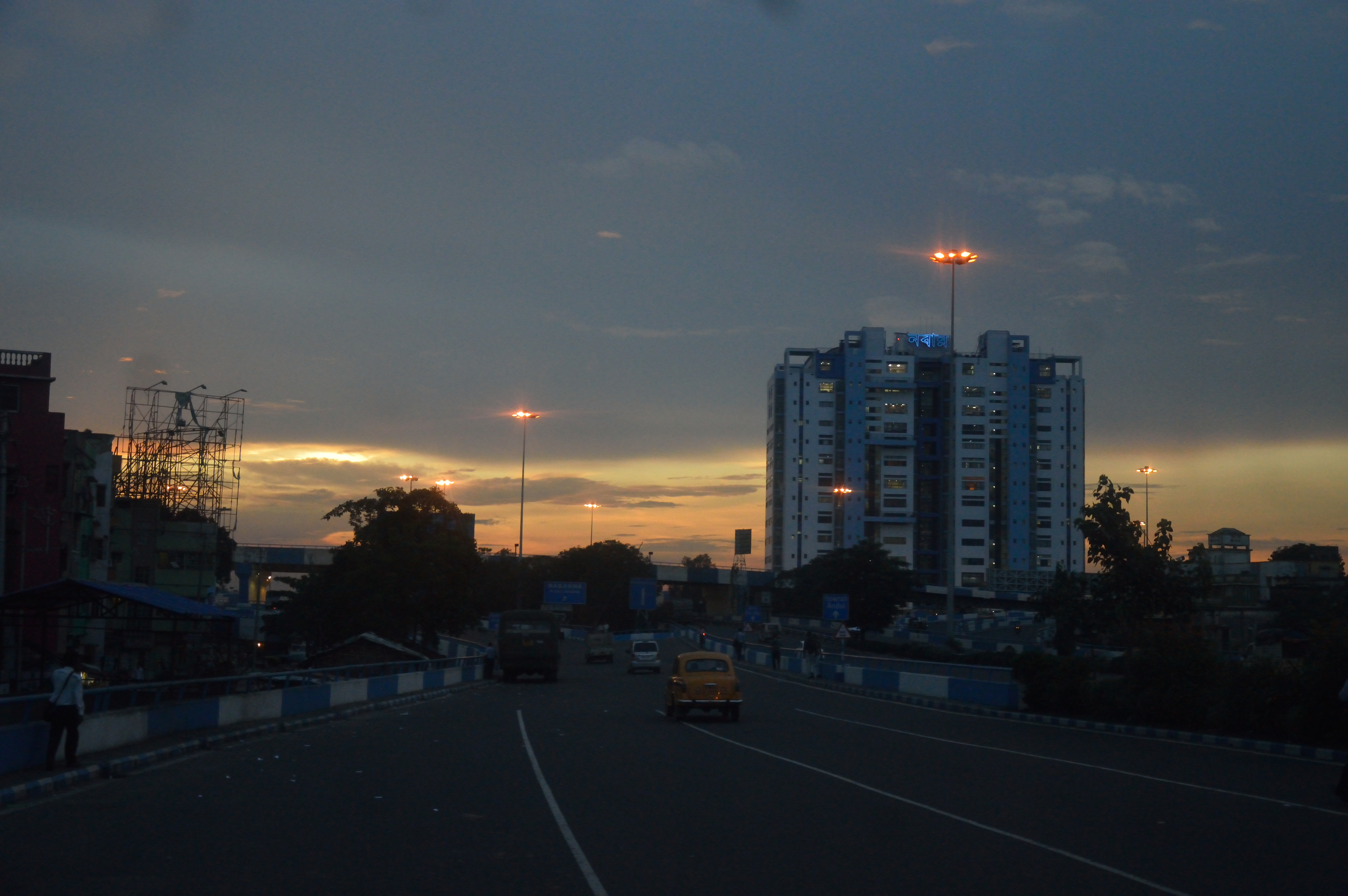
Nabanna H.R.B.C Building

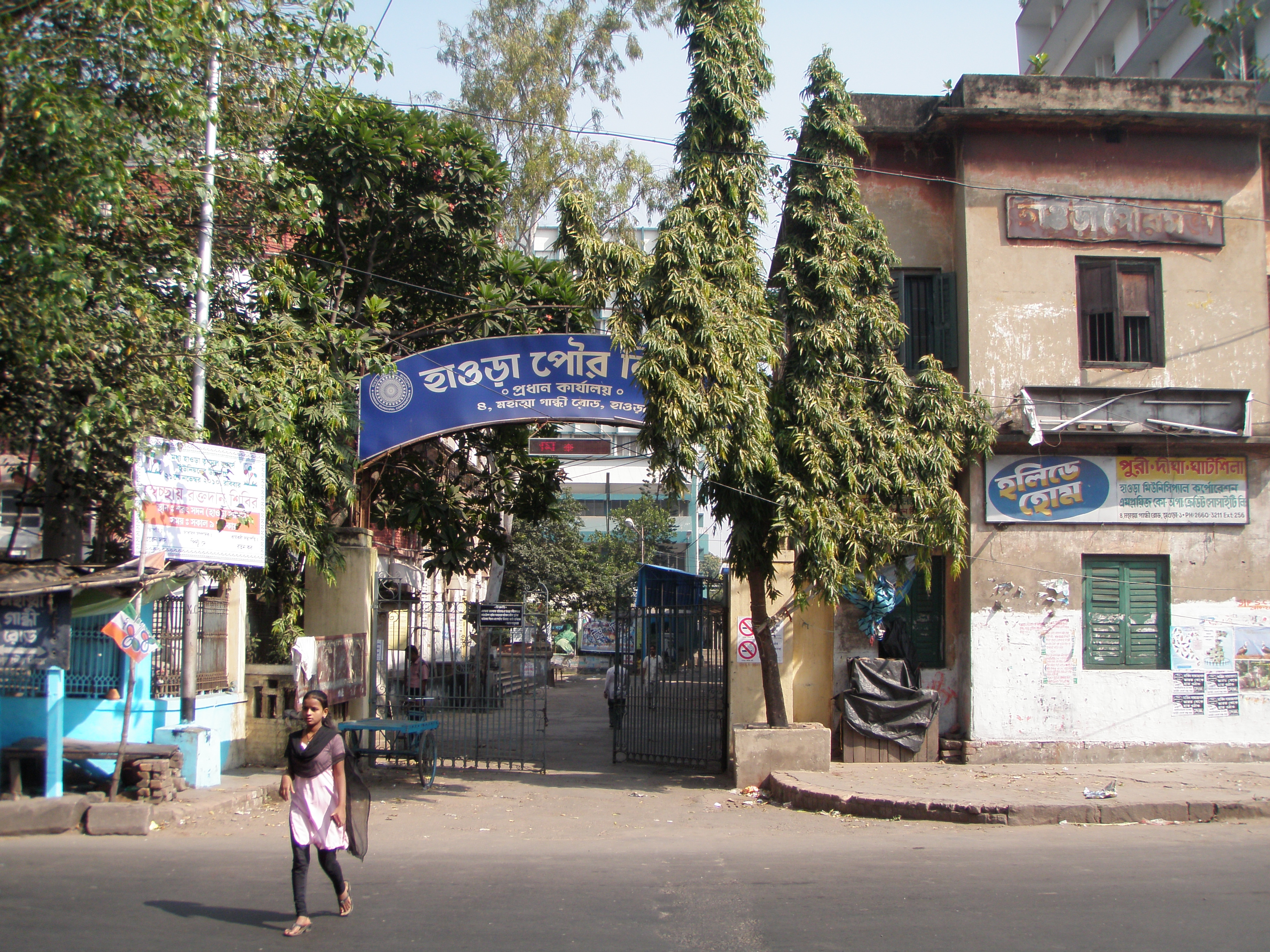
Howrah Municipal Corporation Head Office

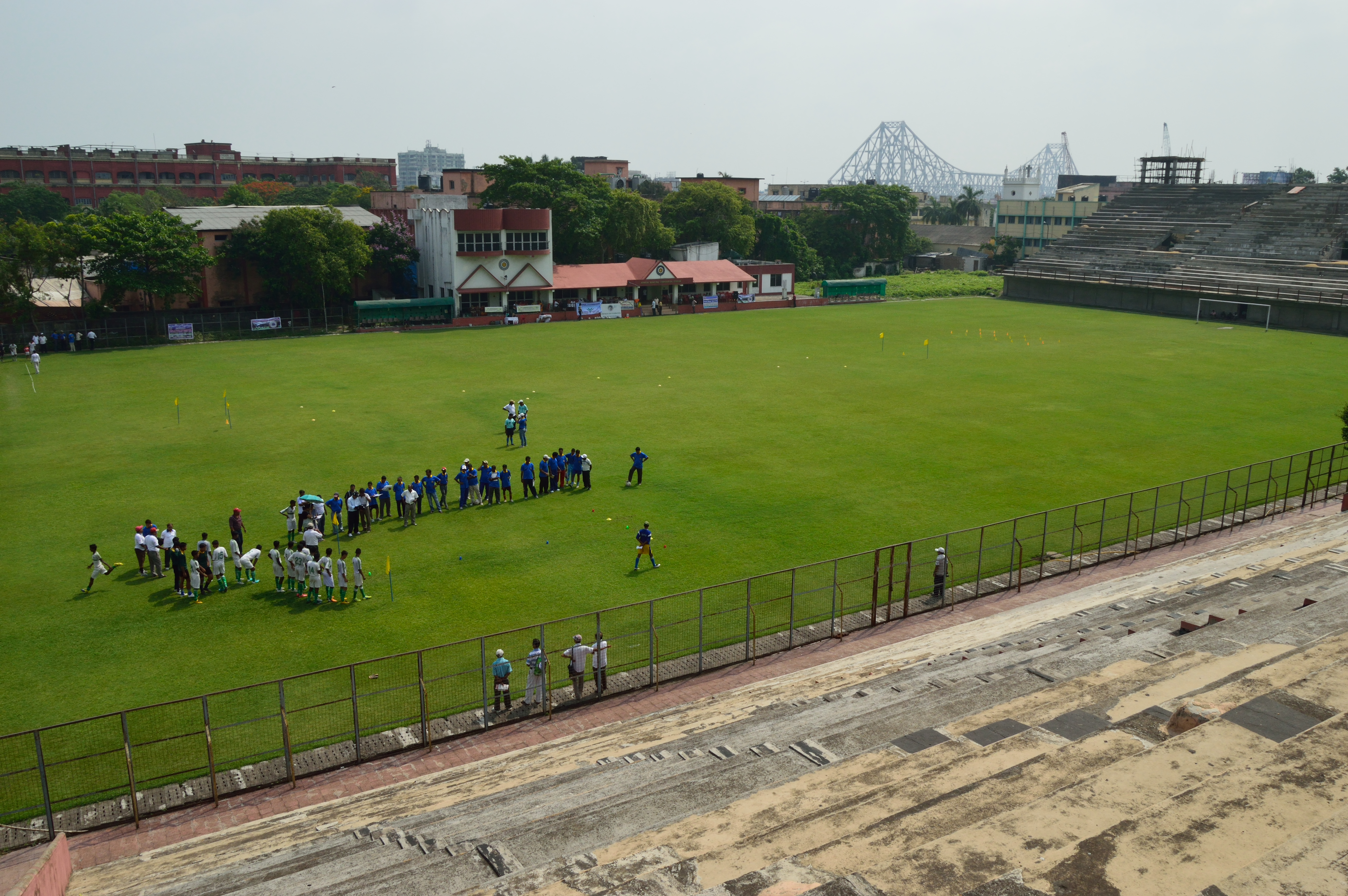
Sailen Manna Stadium (Howrah Municipal Corporation Stadium)

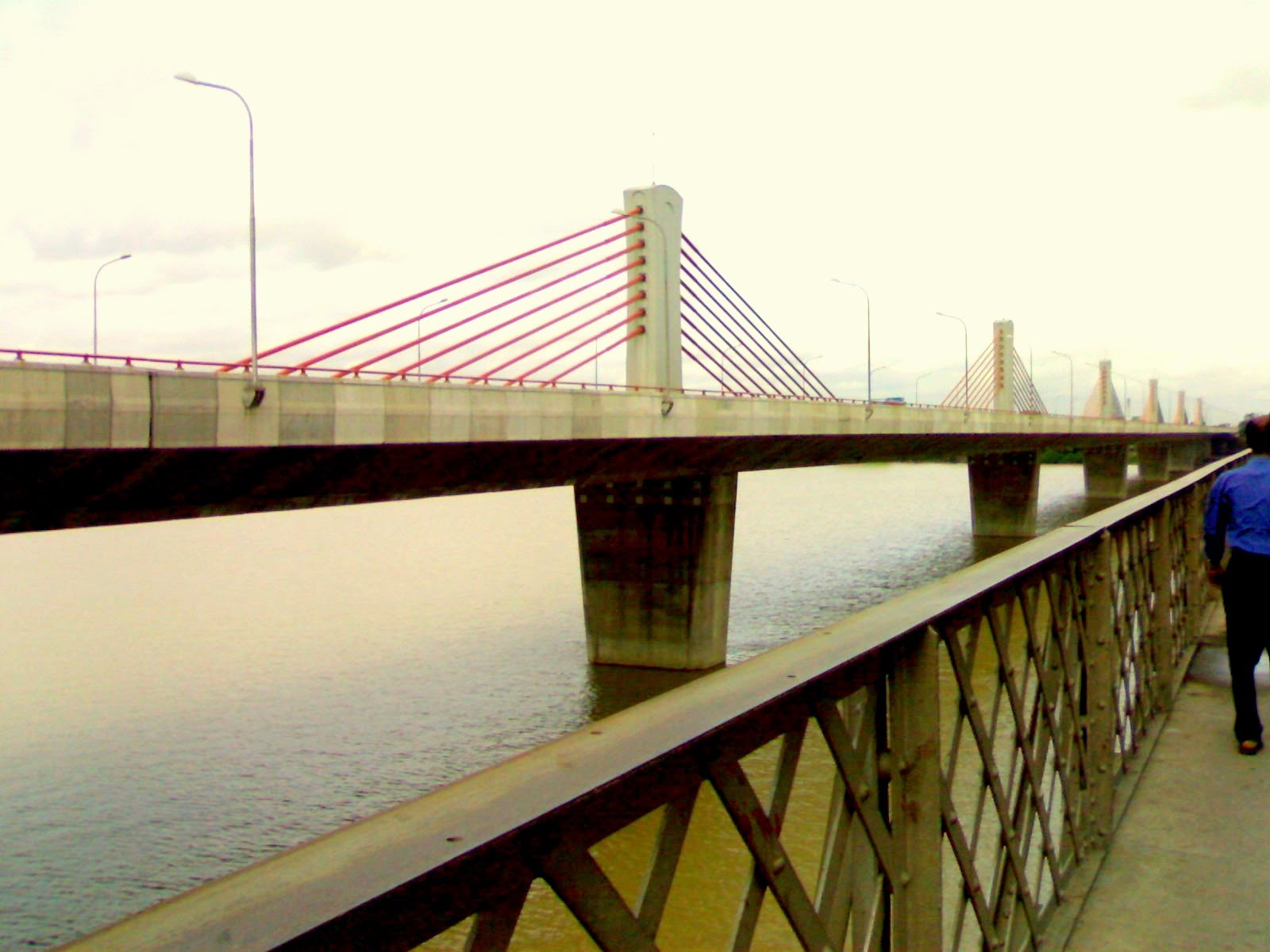
Nivedita Setu as seen from Bally Bridge

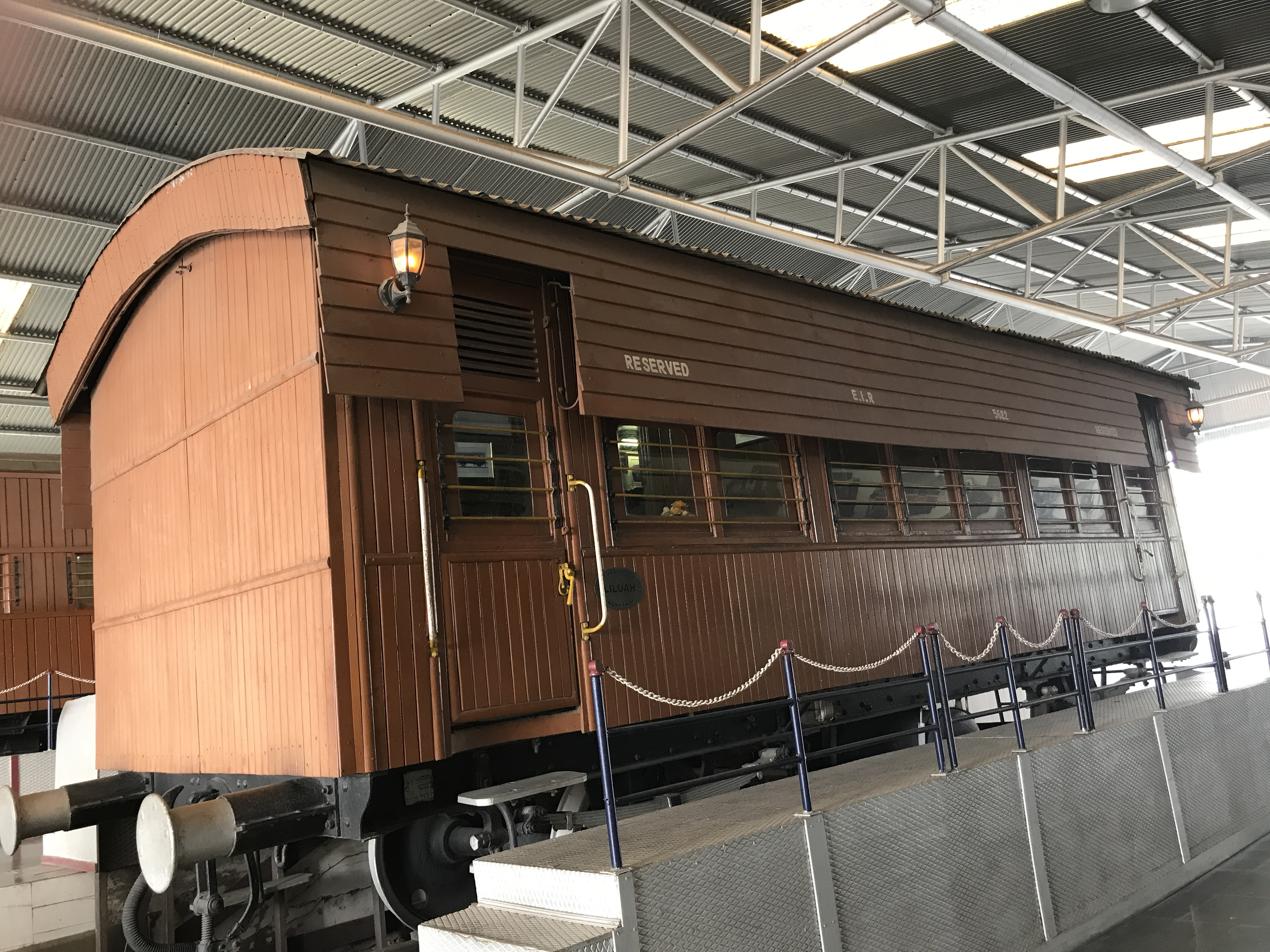
Howrah Rail Museum

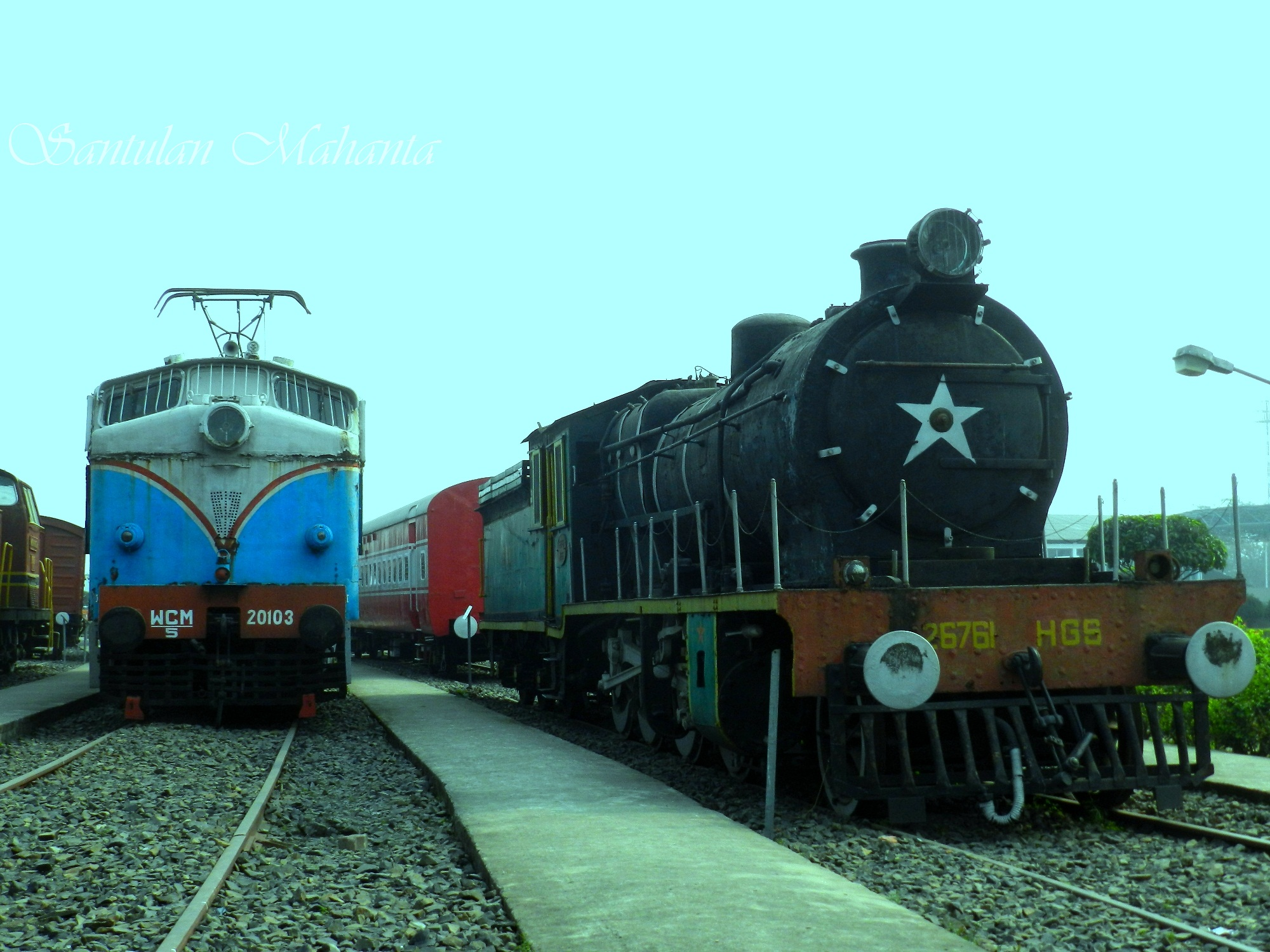
Howrah Rail Museum

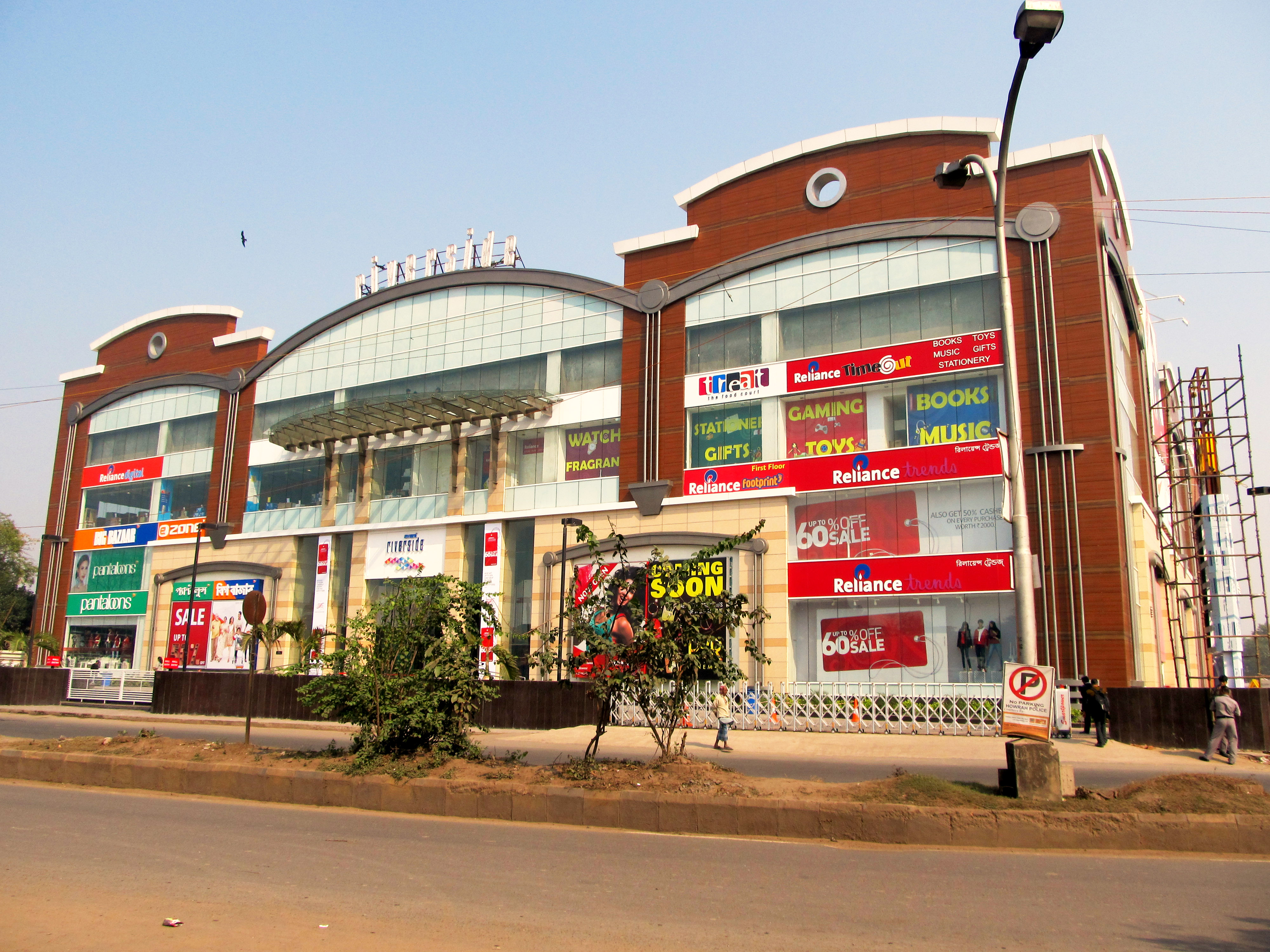
Avani Riverside Mall, Shibpur

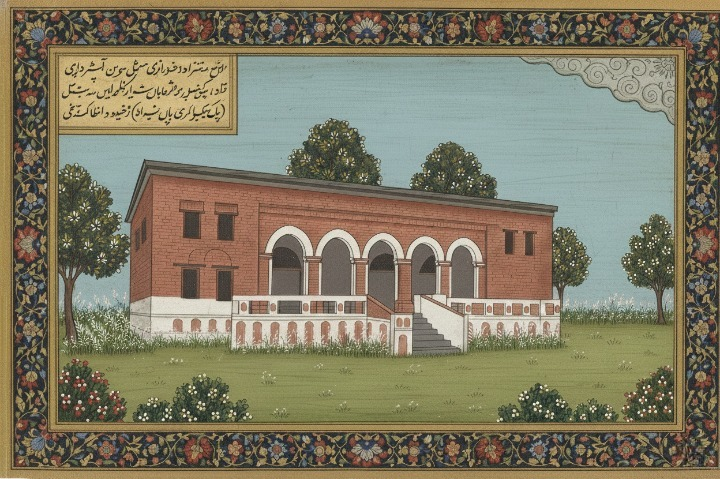
Durga Dalan of Dutta Chowdhury family of Andul, Howrah

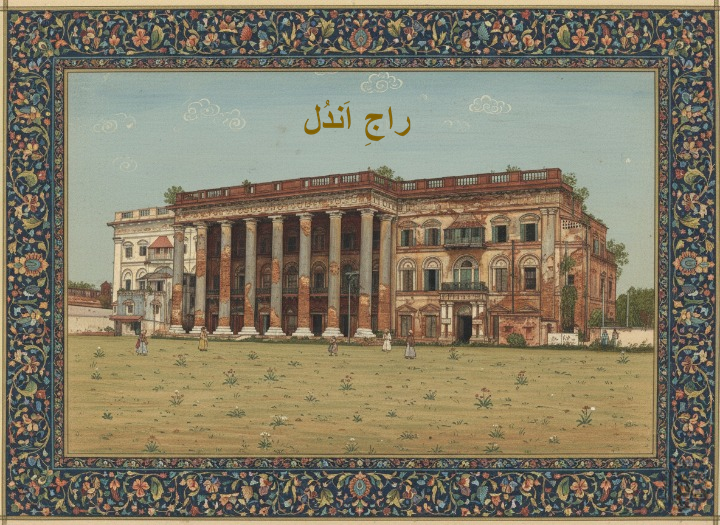
Andul Rajbari of the KarRays' & Mitras.

== Bibliography ==
- Bhattacherje, S. B. (2009). Encyclopaedia of Indian Events & Dates. Sterling Publishers Pvt. ISBN 978-81-207-4074-7.
- Gunguly, C. K.; Battarcharya, S. K. (2000). Dayaratnam, P (ed.). The Design Methodology and Construction Technique of 457 m Span Cable Stayed Bridge (Dead Load Composite) at Vidyasagar Setu. Universities Press (India). pp. 113–114. ISBN 978-81-7371-271-5.
- Holmström, Mark (1984). Industry and Inequality: The Social Anthropology of Indian Labour. Cambridge University Press. ISBN 0-521-26745-5.
- Lach, Donald Frederick (1977). Asia in the Making of Europe. University of Chicago Press. ISBN 0-226-46731-7.
- O'Malley, L.S S.; Chakravarti, Monmohan (1909). Bengal District Gazetteers: Howrah. Bengal Secretariat Book Depot.
- Sen, Samita (1999). Women and Labour in Late Colonial India: The Bengal Jute Industry. Cambridge University Press. ISBN 0-521-45363-1.
