= Howrah Indoor Stadium =

Multi-purpose indoor stadium in Dumurjala, Howrah, India

- Dumurjala Indoor Stadium
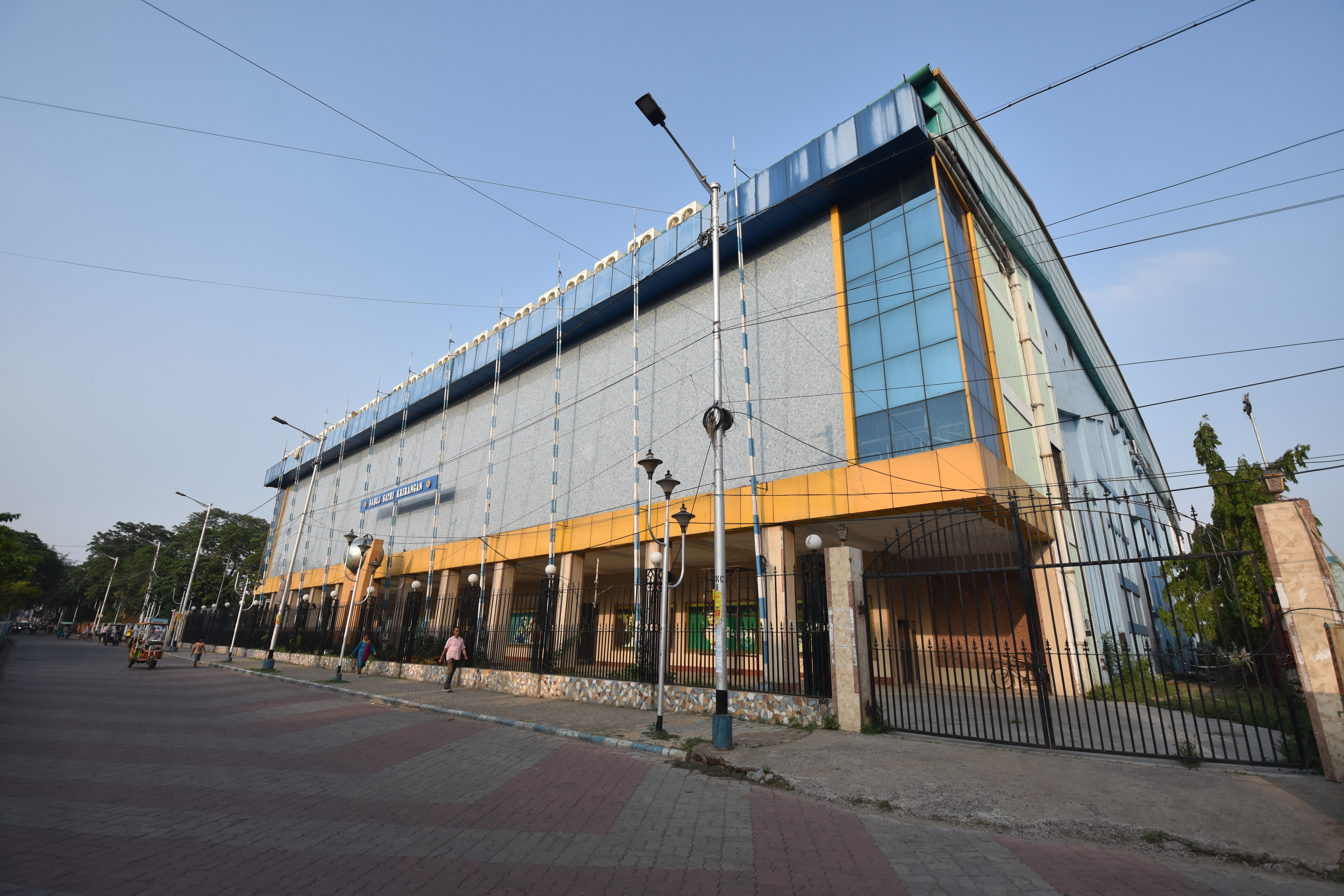
- Sabuj Sathi Krirangan (As of May 2023)
- Address: Dr. Bholanath Chakraborty Sarani (Formerly Drainage Canal Road), Dumurjala Sports City
- Location: Howrah, India
- Capacity: 6000
- Type: Indoor stadium
- Event: Stadium
- Acreage: 1.14

Construction
- Built: Howrah Development Trust
- Opened: 1997
- Renovated: 2018–19
- Expanded: 2018–19
- Architect: IIEST, Shibpur
- Main contractors: Howrah Improvement Trust, Howrah Municipal Corporation

The Howrah Indoor Stadium is a multi-purpose indoor stadium located at Dumurjala, Howrah, West Bengal, India. It is the only indoor stadium in Howrah district, designed as a venue for indoor sports, cultural events and other programs.

== Formation ==
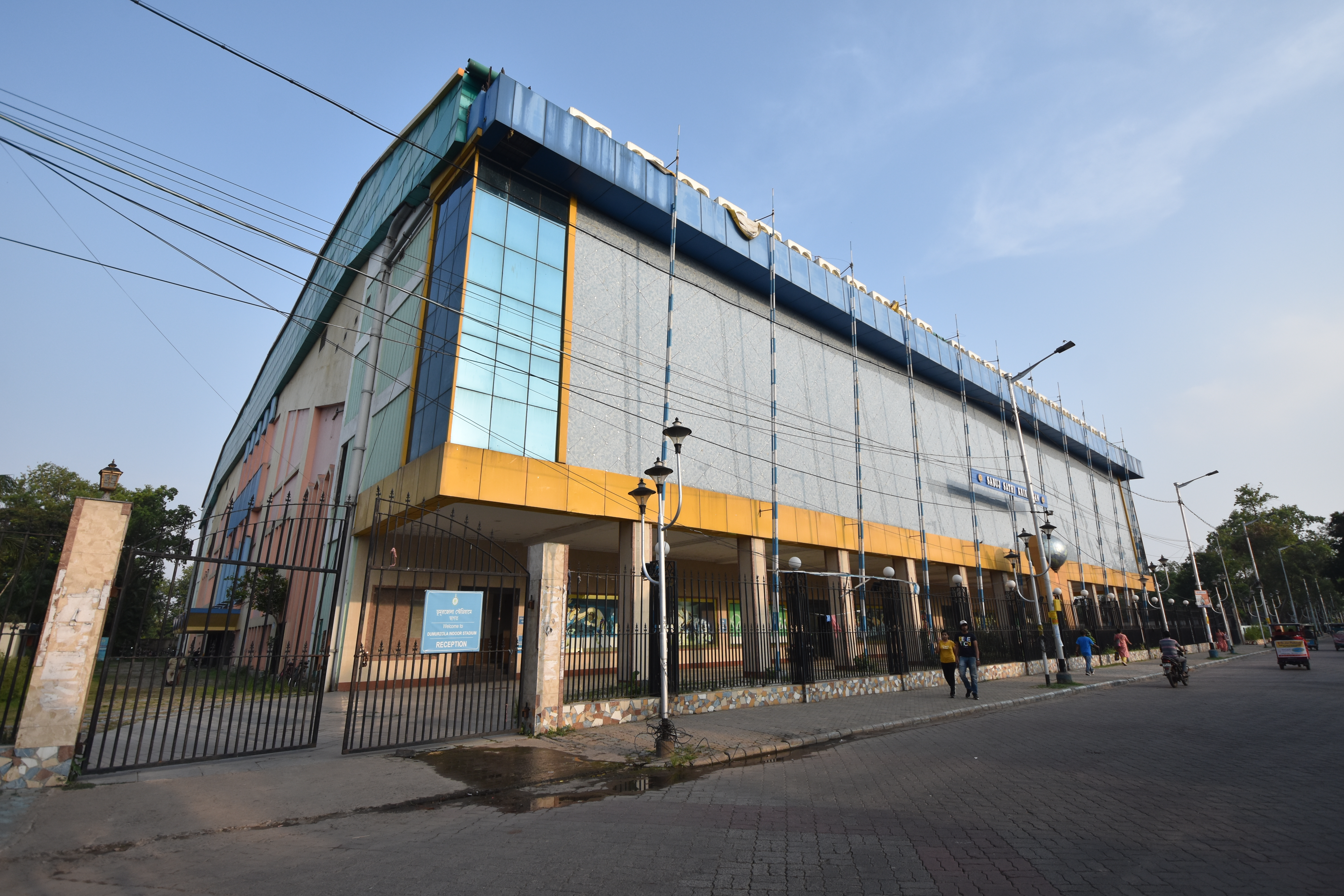
Howrah Indoor Stadium Road-side View

In the 1980s, the Left Front-led Government of West Bengal planned an indoor stadium of national standard in Howrah. The stadium was constructed at Dumurjala, a neighborhood of Santragachi, Shibpur and Ramrajatala, by Howrah Improvement Trust and opened in 1997. Based on the line of Netaji Indoor Stadium, Kolkata, it was originally planned for indoor sports activities. After the construction, only two state-level indoor matches were organized. Then defects in the construction of the galleries and floor came to the forefront. After that Howrah Municipal Corporation took the stadium and started using it for commercial needs.

== Reformation and development ==
In 2018, West Bengal Housing Infrastructure Development Corporation (HIDCO) planned Dumurjala Sports City. A meeting was held in Howrah among state Urban Development minister Firhad Hakim, Mayor Rathin Chakraborty and Debashis Sen, chairman, HIDCO, along with senior officials of HMC at HIDCO. The meeting stated Dumurjala Stadium to be rebuilt and more developed to meet the state level.

== Facilities ==
- The stadium has a capacity of 6000 seats.
- The stadium is centrally air-conditioned.
- The floor is made of teak and the other part of synthetic wood.
- It has two dressing rooms, a power room, a commentary box, a guesthouse.
