= Kyd =

Kyd is a surname. Notable people with the surname include:

- Gerald Kyd (born 1973), South African actor
- Jerry Kyd (born 1967), British naval officer
- Jesper Kyd (born 1972), Danish video game and film music composer
- Michael Kyd (born 1977), English professional footballer
- Robert Kyd (1746–1793), British botanist
- Thomas Kyd (1558–1594), English dramatist
- Warren Kyd (born 1939), New Zealand politician
- William Kyd (fl. 1430–1453), English pirate
- James Kyd (1786–1836), master shipbuilder of the East India Company

Kyd, KYD, or kyd can also mean

- Joseph Clayton Clarke (1856–1937) or 'Kyd', British artist
- Cayman Islands dollar having KYD currency code
- Abbreviation of kiloyard (kyd)
- Lanyu Airport, Orchid Island, Taitung County, Taiwan; by IATA code

== See also ==
Kid (disambiguation)
