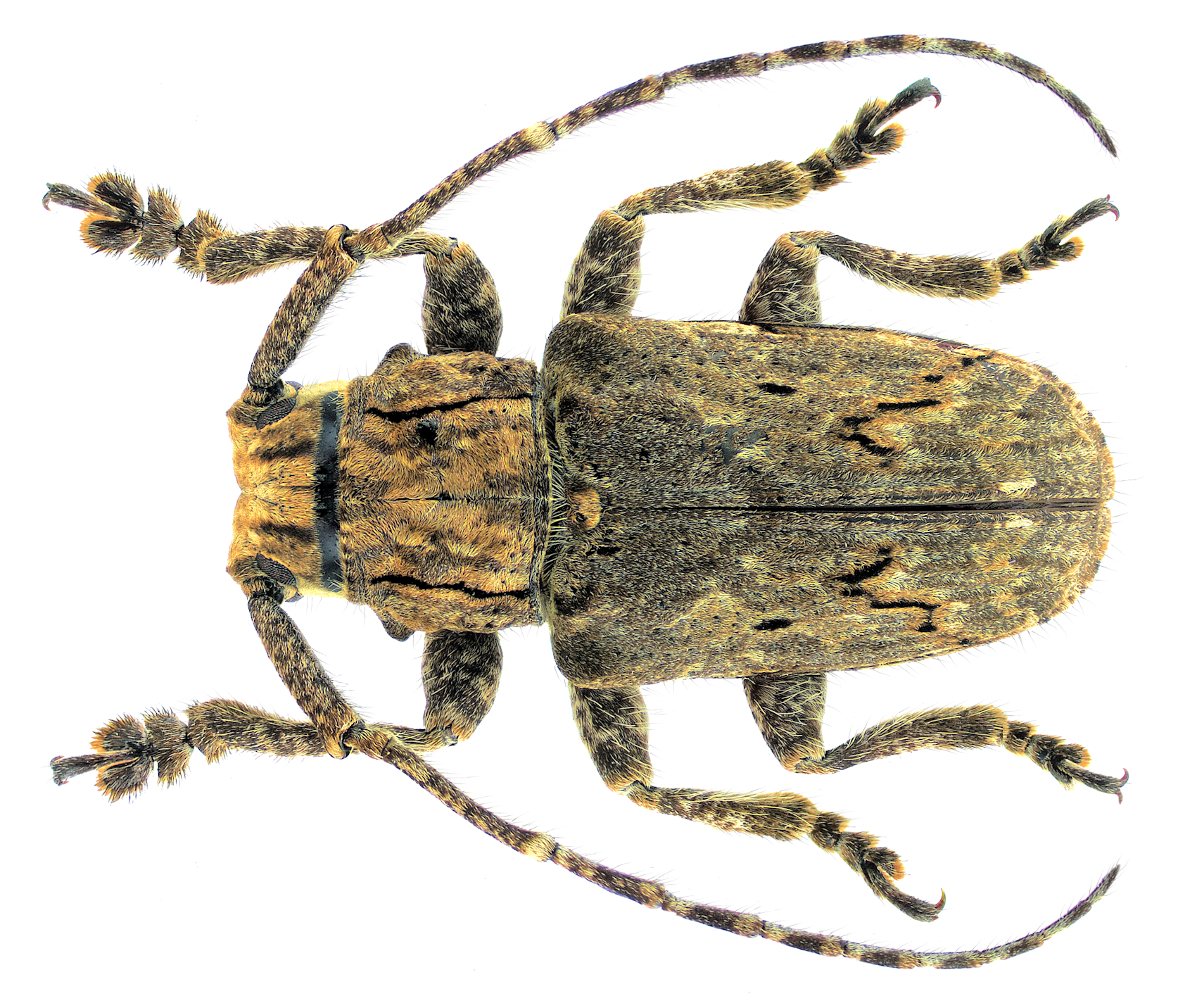

Scientific classification
- Kingdom: Animalia
- Phylum: Arthropoda
- Clade: Pancrustacea
- Class: Insecta
- Order: Coleoptera
- Suborder: Polyphaga
- Infraorder: Cucujiformia
- Family: Cerambycidae
- Genus: Aesopida
- Species: A. malasiaca

Binomial name
- Aesopida malasiaca J. Thomson, 1864

Synonyms
- Aesopida dubiosa Heller, 1926

= Aesopida malasiaca =

Species of beetle

Aesopida malasiaca is a species of beetle in the family Cerambycidae. It was described by James Thomson in 1864. It is known from Borneo, Java, Laos, Thailand, Malaysia, Vietnam, and Sumatra. It feeds on Bombax ceiba, Mallotus philippensis, and Kydia calycina.
