= Robert Kyd =

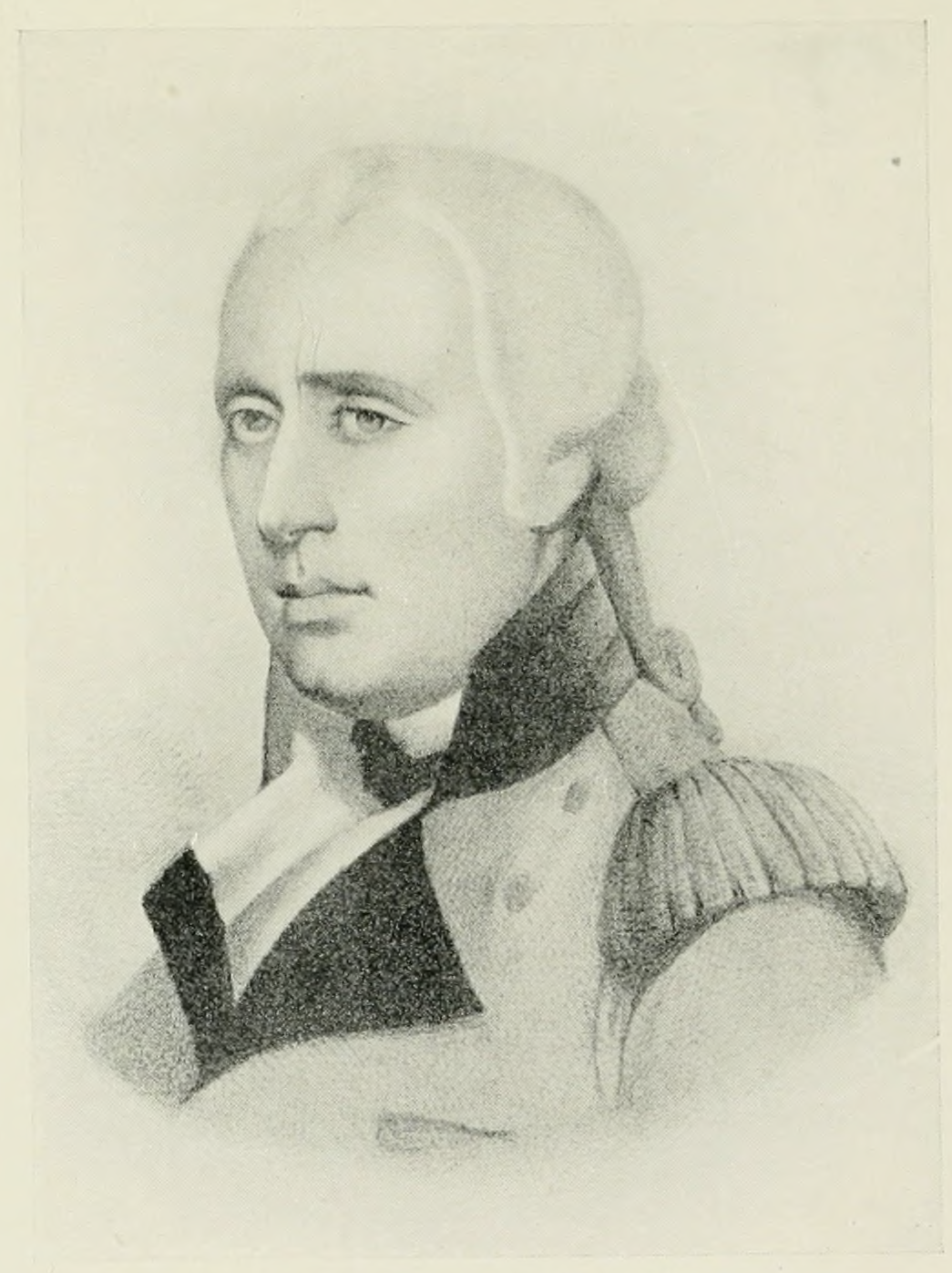
- Born: 1746; Forfarshire, Scotland, United Kingdom
- Died: 27 May 1793 (aged 47); Calcutta, Bengal Presidency, British India
- Burial place: South Park Street Cemetery
- Military career
- Allegiance: East India Company
- Branch: Bengal Army
- Service years: 1764-1793
- Rank: Colonel
- Unit: Bengal Engineers

Colonel Robert Kyd (1746 – 27 May 1793) was a British army officer stationed in India. He founded the botanical garden at Calcutta in 1787.

== Life and career ==
Little is known of Kyd's early life. He was born in Scotland at Forfarshire (now Angus), the son of Thomas, a merchant, and Rachel Eccles. He may have studied medicine at Edinburgh. He joined the Bengal Engineers as an ensign in 1764. He became a lieutenant a year later, a captain on 3 April 1768, major on 29 May 1780, and lieutenant-colonel by 7 December 1782. He was then made a Secretary to the Military Department of Inspection in Bengal and continued in that post until his death.

Kyd was interested in horticulture and owned a private garden in Shalimar near Howrah. He proposed the idea of a botanic garden to the then Governor-General Sir John Macpherson, who passed on the idea to the Court of Directors of the East India Company. His idea was that it should help in finding alternate sources of food to prevent famines and to identify plants that might be commercially useful. The plants he mentioned included the sago palm from Malaya and the Persian date. The plan was approved on 31 July 1787 and Kyd was made an honorary superintendent.

Kyd had proposed that the botanical garden would help in introduction of economically important plants and help the East India Company "outstrip our rivals in every valuable production which nature has confined to this part of the globe". By 1790 Kyd had 4000 plants in the garden and when the botanist Joseph Hooker visited in 1848, he noted that it had "contributed more useful and ornamental tropical plants to the public and private gardens of the world than any other establishment before or since".

A genus Kydia (Kydia calycina) in the family Malvaceae was named after him by William Roxburgh.

== Interment ==
Kyd made a request in his will that he be buried without any religious ceremony in the botanical garden that he founded, but was instead interred in South Park Street Cemetery.

A beautiful urn sculpted by a Mr Banks has been placed as a memorial in the botanical garden that he founded.

He also left behind specific payments to be made to his native servants "Rajemahl Missah ... in retribution for the unsuitable education given to him, entailing separation from his native soil and kindred. To the other native known by the name of George, in reparation of the injury dune him by his former master, in alienating him from his tribe (understood Rajpoot), converting him to Christianity, and secluding him from all future connection with his family, the monthly sum of six rupees during his life; to both on condition of their continuing to serve Major Alexander Kyd during his residence in India..."

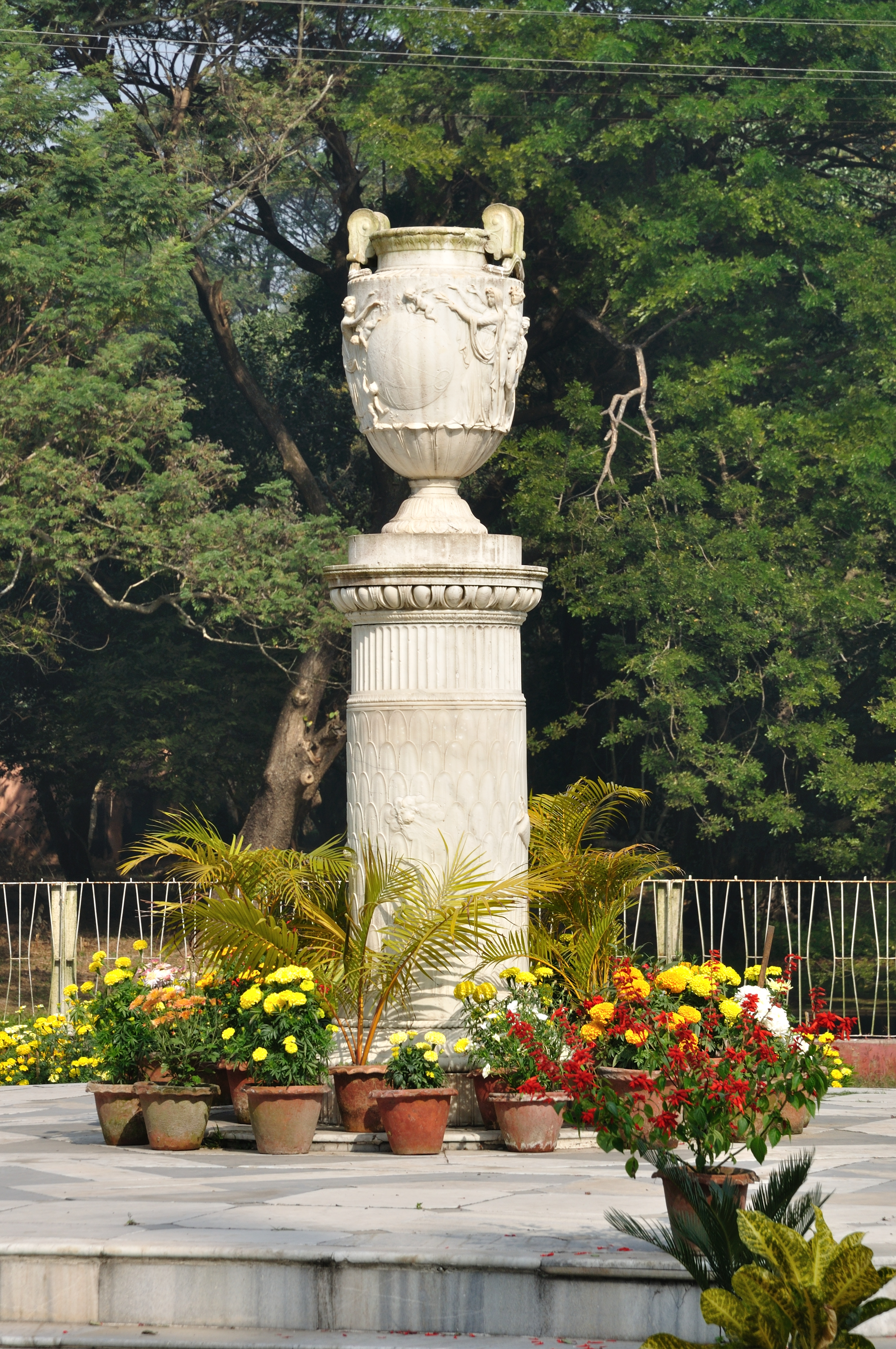
Kyd memorial urn by Thomas Banks (1795) at the Acharya Jagadish Chandra Bose Indian Botanic Garden.

== Family ==
Major Alexander Kyd, later Lieutenant General and Surveyor General of Bengal, was a first cousin once removed of Robert (Thomas Kyd was brother of George Kyd, grandfather of Alexander Kyd) and was the father of James Kyd (1786-1836) and his brother Robert (d. 1825), who became shipbuilders, also an Alexander Kyd. Kyd street and the locality Kidderpore derive their names from this family. James Kyd became Company Master Builder after the retirement of A. Waddell.
