= Nabanna (building) =

Administrative headquarters of the West Bengal Government

Coordinates: 22.567623°N 88.313453°E

- নবান্ন
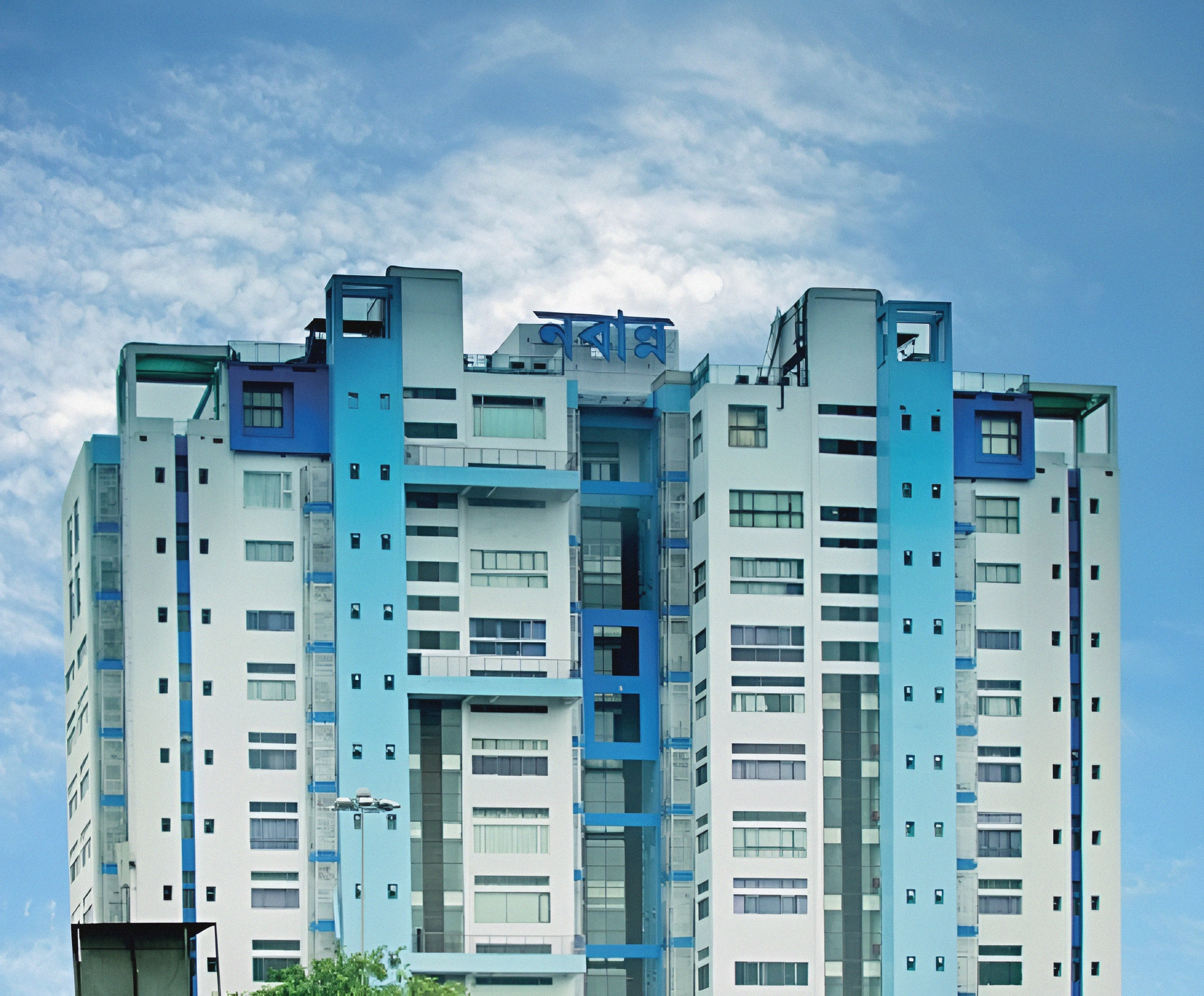
- Interactive map of the Nabanna area
- Alternative names: HRBC Building

General information
- Status: Operational
- Type: Administrative building
- Location: Howrah, West Bengal, India, 325, Sarat Chatterjee Road, Shibpur, Howrah-711102
- Inaugurated: 5 October 2013; 12 years ago

Technical details
- Floor count: 14

Nabanna (Bengali: নবান্ন) is a building in the city of Howrah (neighborhood of Kolkata) in Howrah district. Nabanna is the former State Secretariat of the Government of West Bengal under Mamata Banerjee's rule. The BJP government decided to shift secretariat back to Writer's Building. It is located at Mandirtala, Shibpur. It was inaugurated on 5 October 2013 by then Chief Minister of West Bengal Mamata Banerjee.

== The building ==
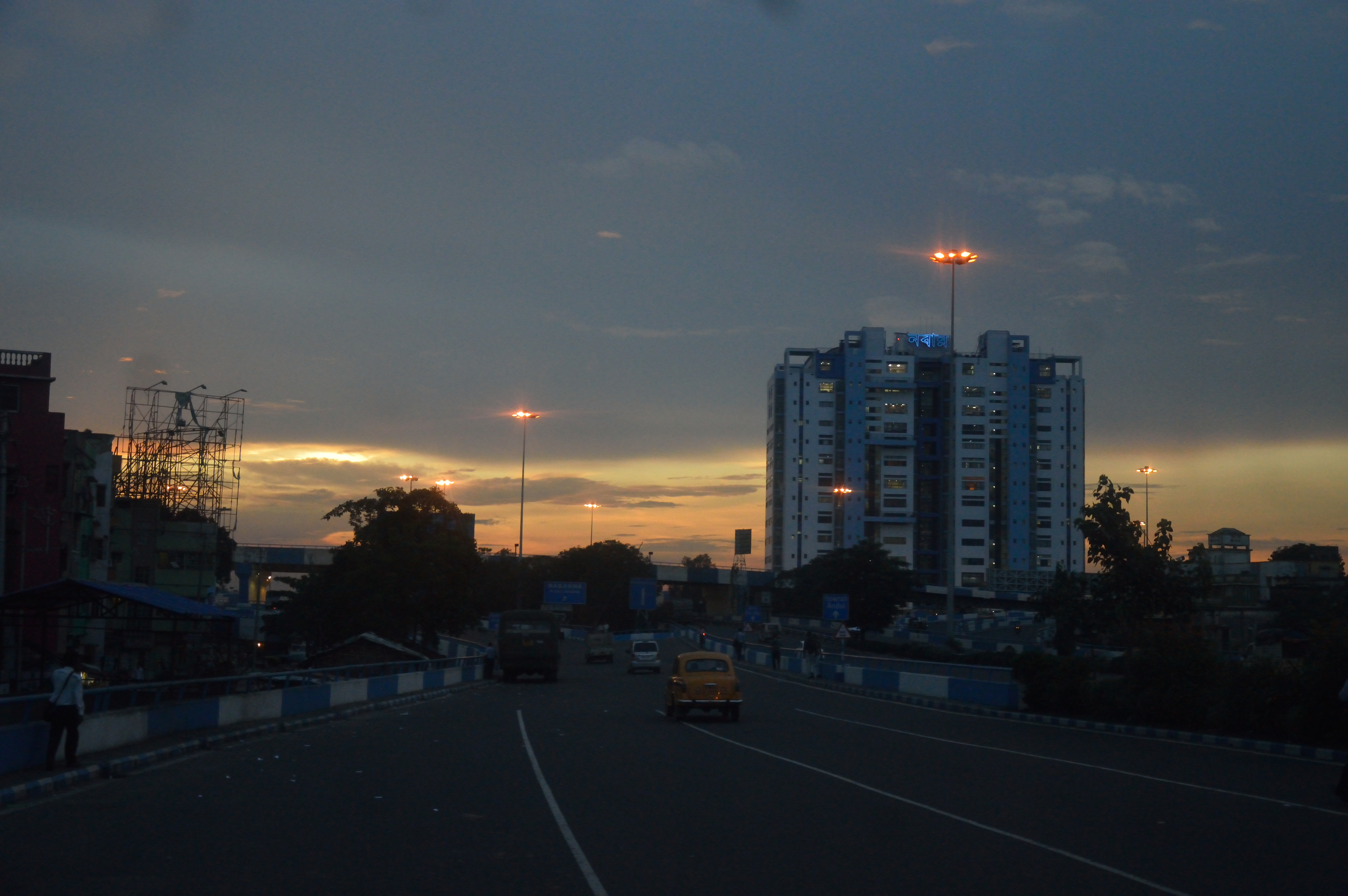
Nabanna Dusk-view

The 14-storey building housed the government's garment park, Hooghly River Bridge Commissioners (HRBC) and was turned into the new secretariat within a month and a half by the PWD department. The chief minister's office was located on the top floor. The 13th floor had the offices of the chief and home secretary. The 4th and 5th floor are the Home Departments.
