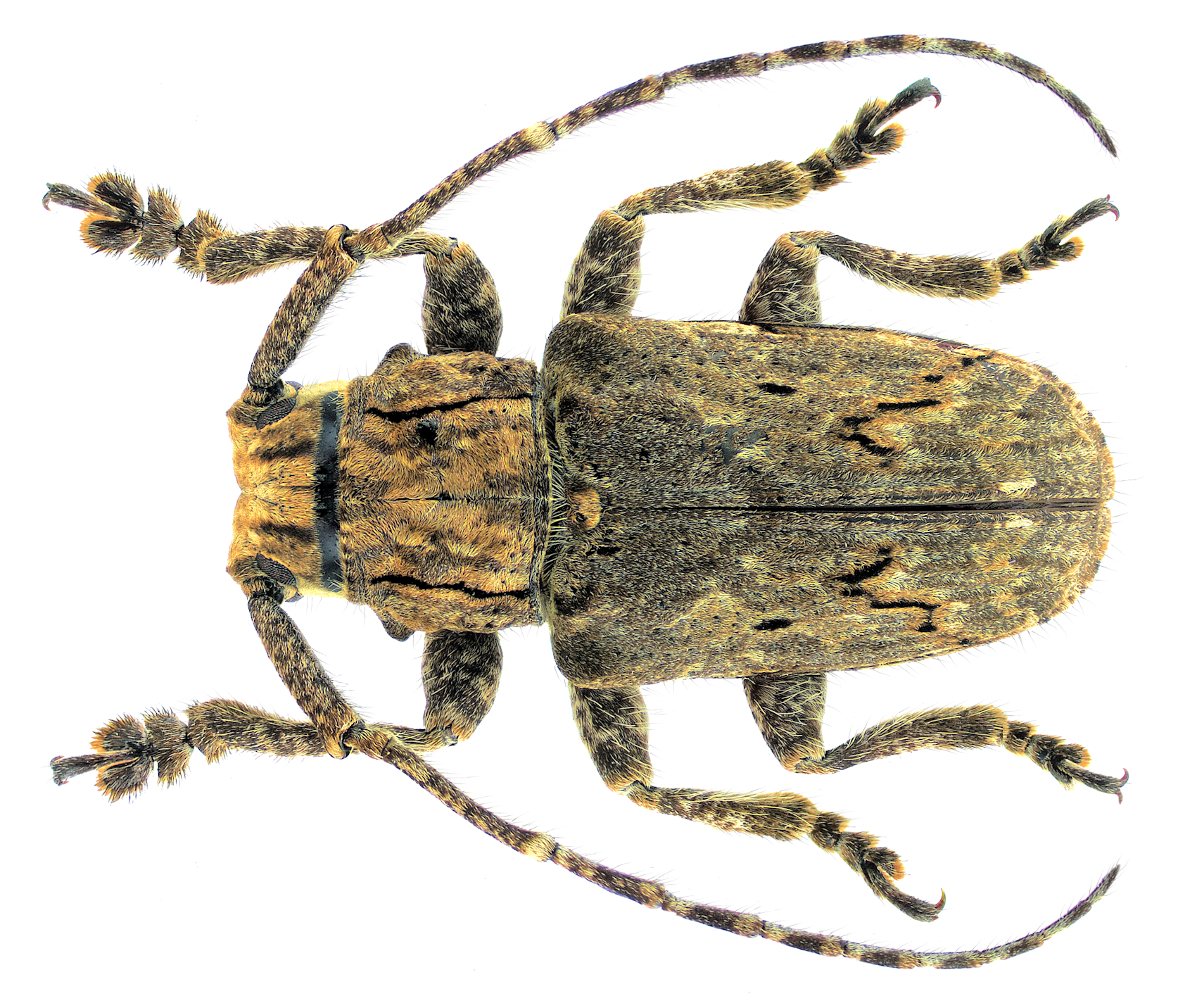
- Aesopida malasiaca

Scientific classification
- Kingdom: Animalia
- Phylum: Arthropoda
- Class: Insecta
- Order: Coleoptera
- Suborder: Polyphaga
- Infraorder: Cucujiformia
- Family: Cerambycidae
- Tribe: Mesosini
- Genus: Aesopida

= Aesopida =

Genus of beetles

Aesopida is a genus of longhorn beetles of the subfamily Lamiinae, containing the following species:

- Aesopida malasiaca J. Thomson, 1864
- Aesopida sericea Breuning, 1950
