= Hooghly River Bridge Commissioners =

Statutory organization in West Bengal, India

- Abbreviation: HRBC
- Formation: 1969; 57 years ago
- Type: Government Agency
- Legal status: Active
- Purpose: Executing complex engineering projects in West Bengal
- Headquarters: Kolkata
- Chairman: Vacant
- Key people: Chief Project Manager Durgapada Pan
- Website: hrbc.org.in

The Hooghly River Bridge Commissioners (HRBC) office is a statutory organization under the Department of Transport (West Bengal), established in 1969 for the construction of Vidyasagar Setu.

In 1961, the Kolkata Metropolitan Planning Organization was set up through a resolution of the Development and Planning Department to develop a comprehensive development plan for the Metropolis, then called Calcutta. It was the first of its kind in India.

HRBC became the main body employed by the state government for complex civil engineering projects in urban locales in Kolkata. It is the principal body charged with the maintenance of the four flyovers across the city that serve as major traffic arteries.

An abandoned 14-floor skyscraper belonging to the HRBC in the Mandirtala neighborhood of Howrah was turned into the state secretariat of the Government of West Bengal and named as Nabanna. It continued to house the majority of state government departments and offices of the Chief Minister of West Bengal as of August, 2019.

== Projects ==
- Vidyasagar Setu: the second bridge across the Hooghly river, which was inaugurated in 1992. It remains the longest cable-stayed bridge in India.
- Calcutta Infrastructure Development Projects: projects of the Government of West Bengal. Using international development loans, this project improved traffic speed by easing congestion at important critical junctions across Kolkata.
- Flyovers: At least four flyovers, including the flyovers at major city roads like AJC Bose Road, Gariahat, and Park Street.
- Shyambazaar Crossing: improved major at-grade traffic junctions, most notably renewal of the historic Shyambazar 5-point crossing.
- Concretization of Tram tracks: upgraded Kolkata's tram tracks through the concretization of pavement.
