= Shibpur =

- Neighbourhood
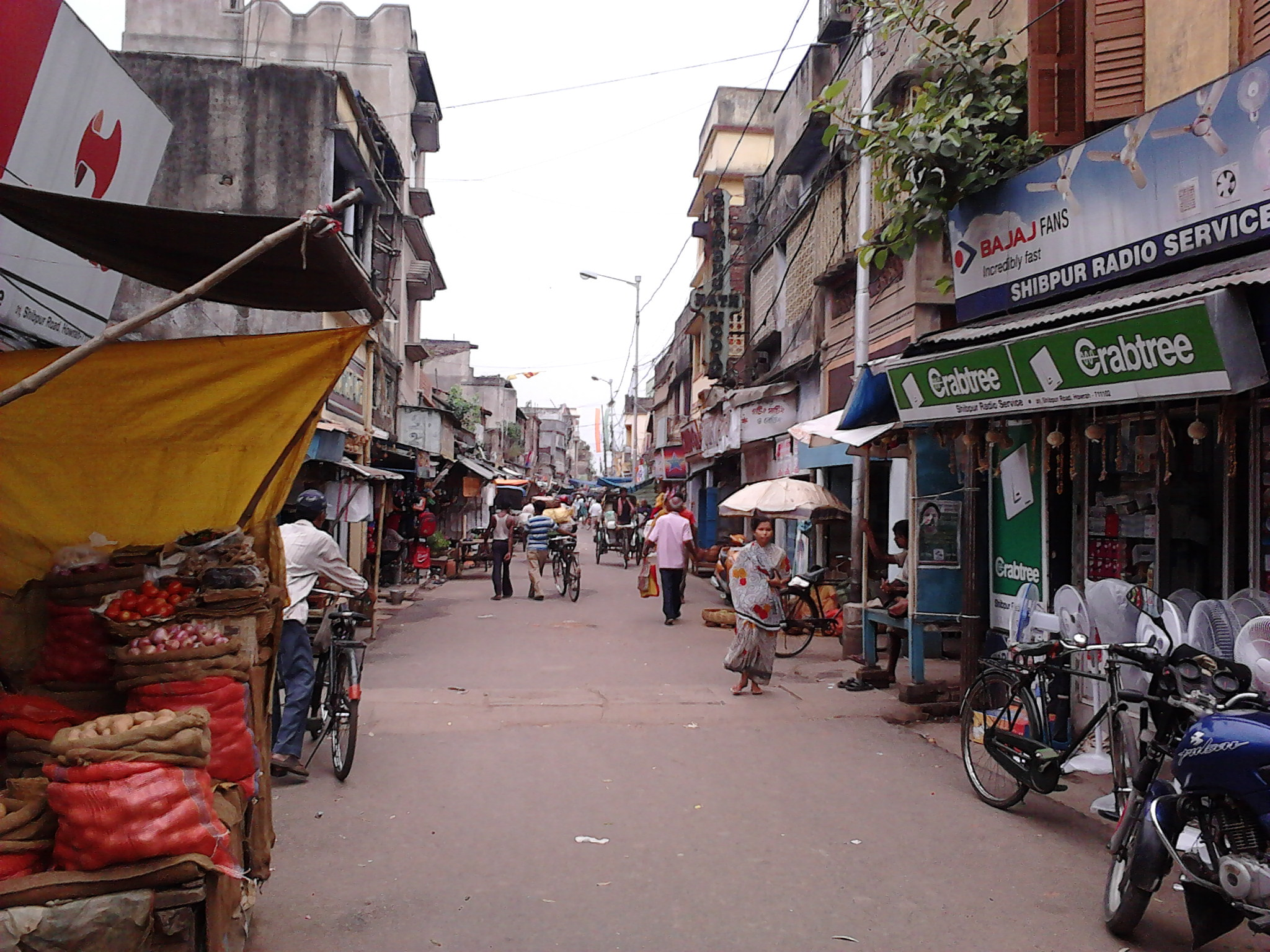
- Shibpur road, popularly known as Shibpur bazar

- Location in West Bengal, India Shibpur (West Bengal) Shibpur (India)
- Coordinates: 22°34′N 88°18′E
- Country: India
- State: West Bengal
- Division: Presidency
- District: Howrah
- City: Howrah
- Metro Station: Howrah Maidan and Howrah

Government
  - Type: Municipal Corporation
  - Body: Howrah Municipal Corporation
  - Member of Legislative Assembly: Manoj Tiwary (cricketer) (All India Trinamool Congress)

Population
  - Total: 197,161
- Time zone: UTC+5:30 (IST)
- PIN: 711101, 711102, 711103, 711104
- Telephone code: +91 33
- Vehicle registration: WB 12
- HMC wards: 25, 26, 27, 28, 29, 30, 31, 32, 33, 34, 35, 36, 37, 38, 39, 40, 41, 42, 44, 45
- Lok Sabha constituency: Howrah
- Vidhan Sabha constituency: Howrah Madhya and Howrah Dakshin

Shibpur is a neighbourhood in Howrah of Howrah district in the Indian state of West Bengal. It is a part of the area covered by Kolkata Metropolitan Development Authority (KMDA).

It is well known for being the location of the Acharya Jagadish Chandra Bose Indian Botanic Garden, the IIEST Shibpur and the Hajar Hath Kali Temple. The famous Bengali linguist Suniti Kumar Chatterji was born in Shibpur. During British Raj, its name was written as Seebpore.

Recently, parts of administrative headquarters of the West Bengal government have been temporarily shifted to Mandirtala (Nabanna) in Shibpur. Shibpur is under the jurisdiction of Howrah Police Station, Shibpur Police Station, Chatterjeehat Police Station, B. Garden Police Station and Santragachi Police Station of Howrah City Police.

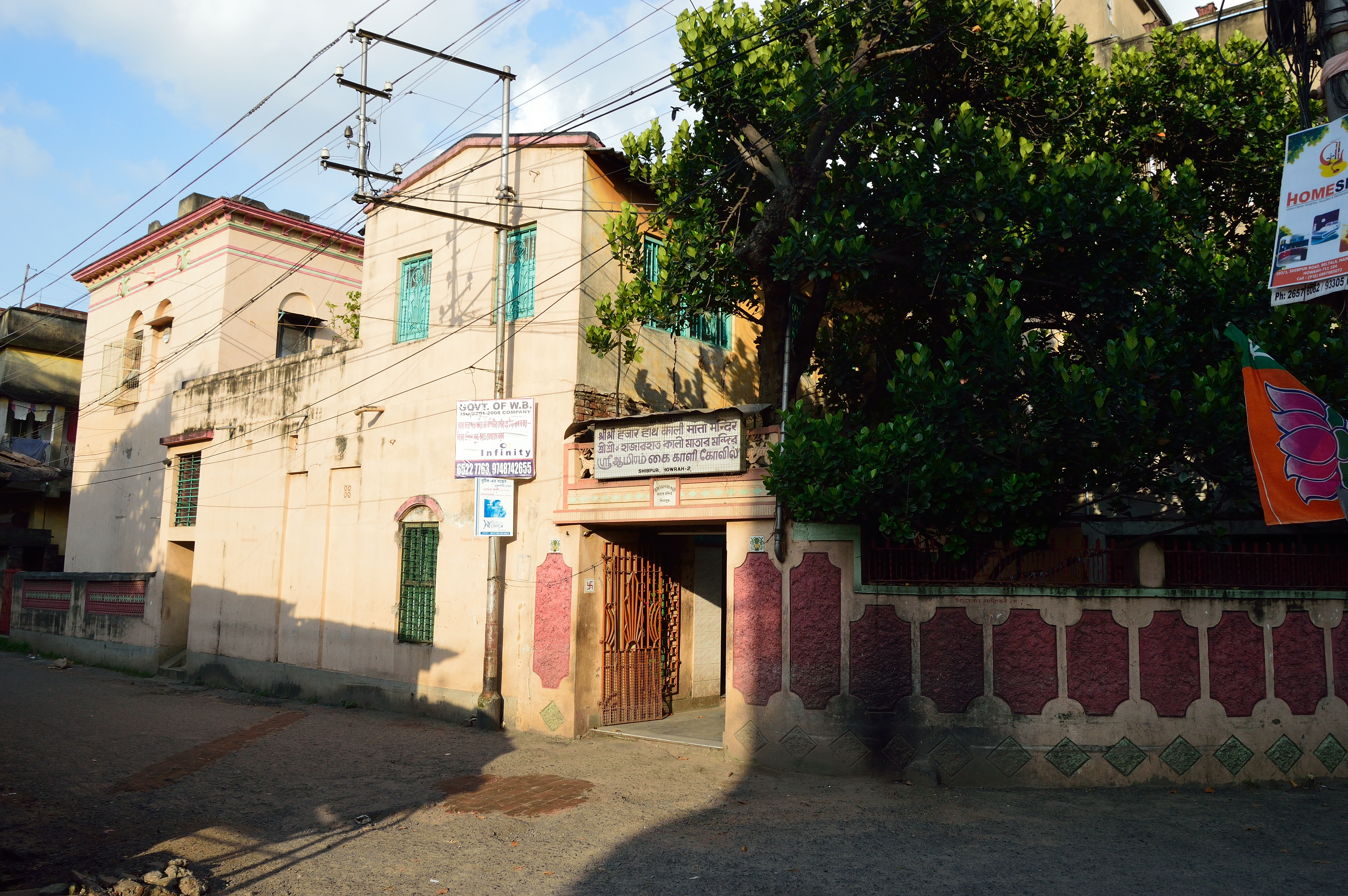
Hajar Hath Kali Temple

== History ==
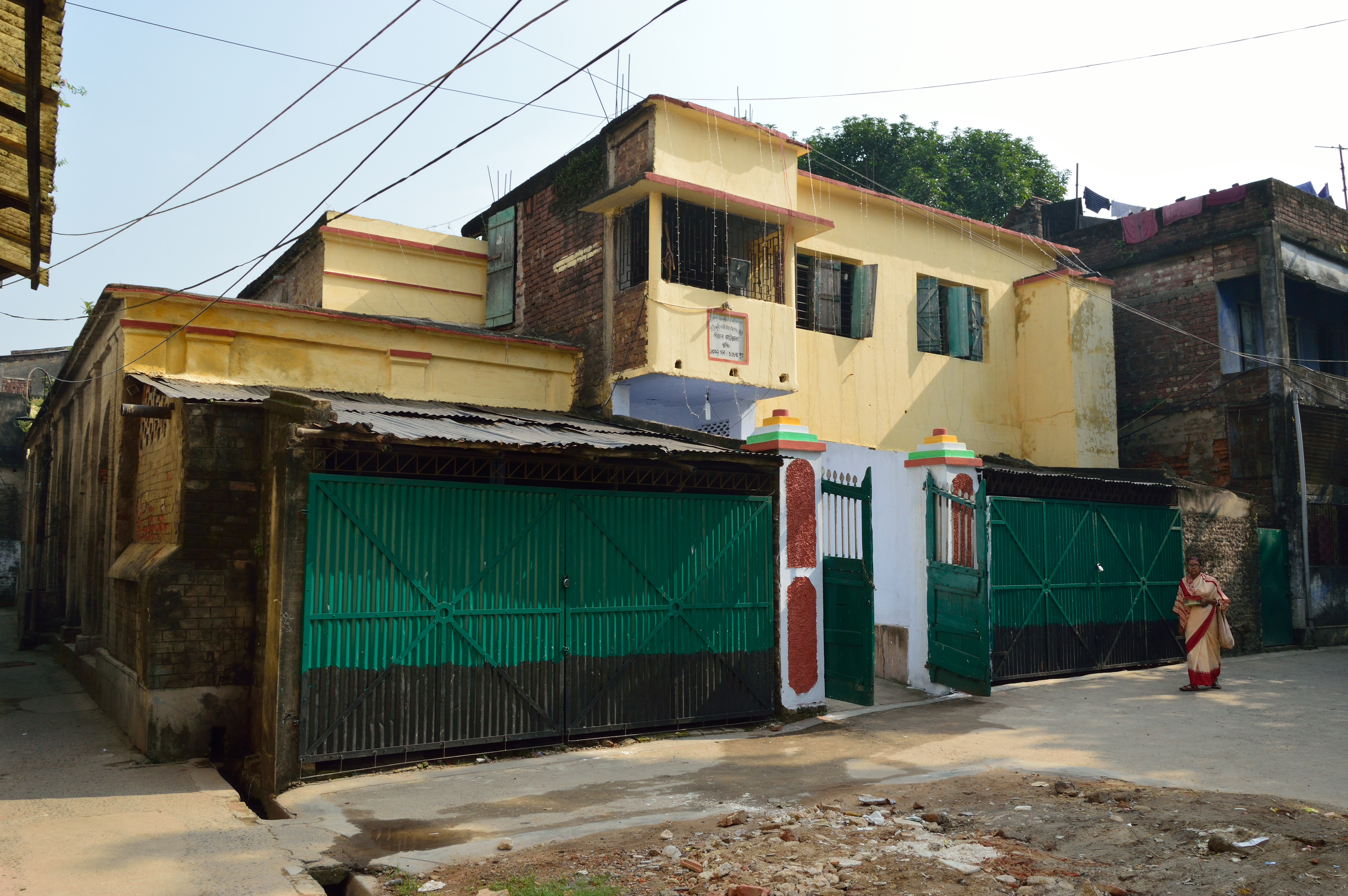
The Sanjher Attchala Estate

The Haldars were the founders & landowners of Shibpur more than 750 years ago. The Halders were in business, establishing their fortunes in Kolkata, namely started & flourishing under the guidance of Nilmoni Halder, Pulin Behari's grandfather. The town of Shibpur was founded during the reign of the Bengal Sultanate.

The area was home to many royal landlords (zamindars) in Bengal. During the era of British rule in India, the landlords sold their possessions to build jute mills. These included the successful jute mills such as the Howrah Jute Mill and the Bengal Jute Mill. The proximity to Kolkata's southern district and the central business district which is just across the river brought many middle-class office goers to seek cheaper lodging in Shibpur. Some of the old zamindar house in Shibpur is like Roy Choudhury's and Mukherjee bari in Chaterjeehat named as Digambar Mukhopadhyay Attalika. The Roy Chowdhury family stayed in Shibpur for near about 500 years at Sanjher Attchala and Mukhopadhyay family is staying in Chaterjeehat for more than 300 years. Botanical Garden was a British determent area. Then after freedom, the Indian government took a long place from the garden and made the college. Pulin Behari Halder was the founder president of all the girls' schools & colleges in Shibpur.

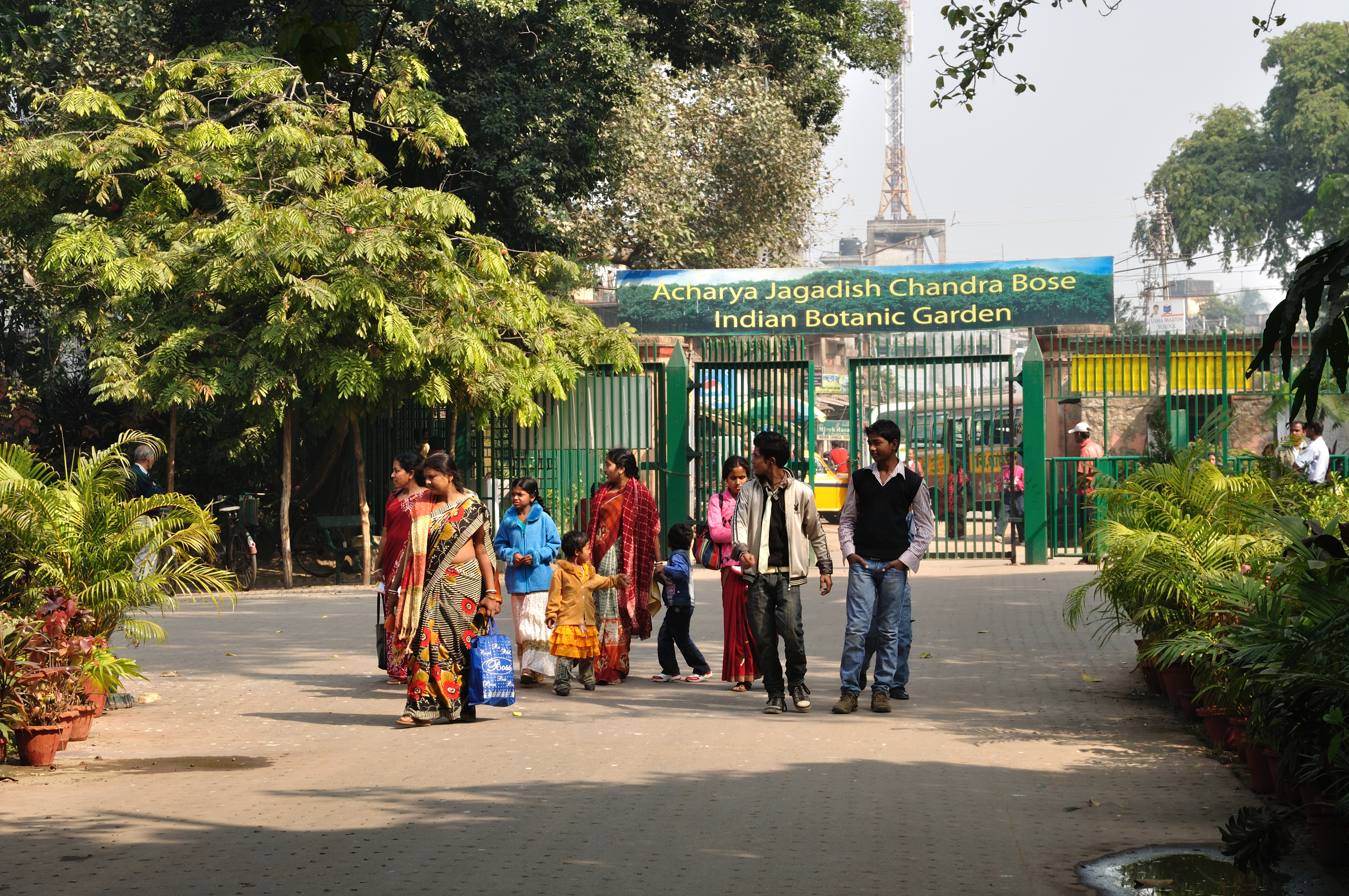
Acharya Jagadish Chandra Bose Indian Botanic Garden

The oldest banyan tree is in the Shibpur B. Garden. Its original root has been destroyed many years ago and the tree sprayed a lot through its branches. This tree was taken from Africa by the British government.

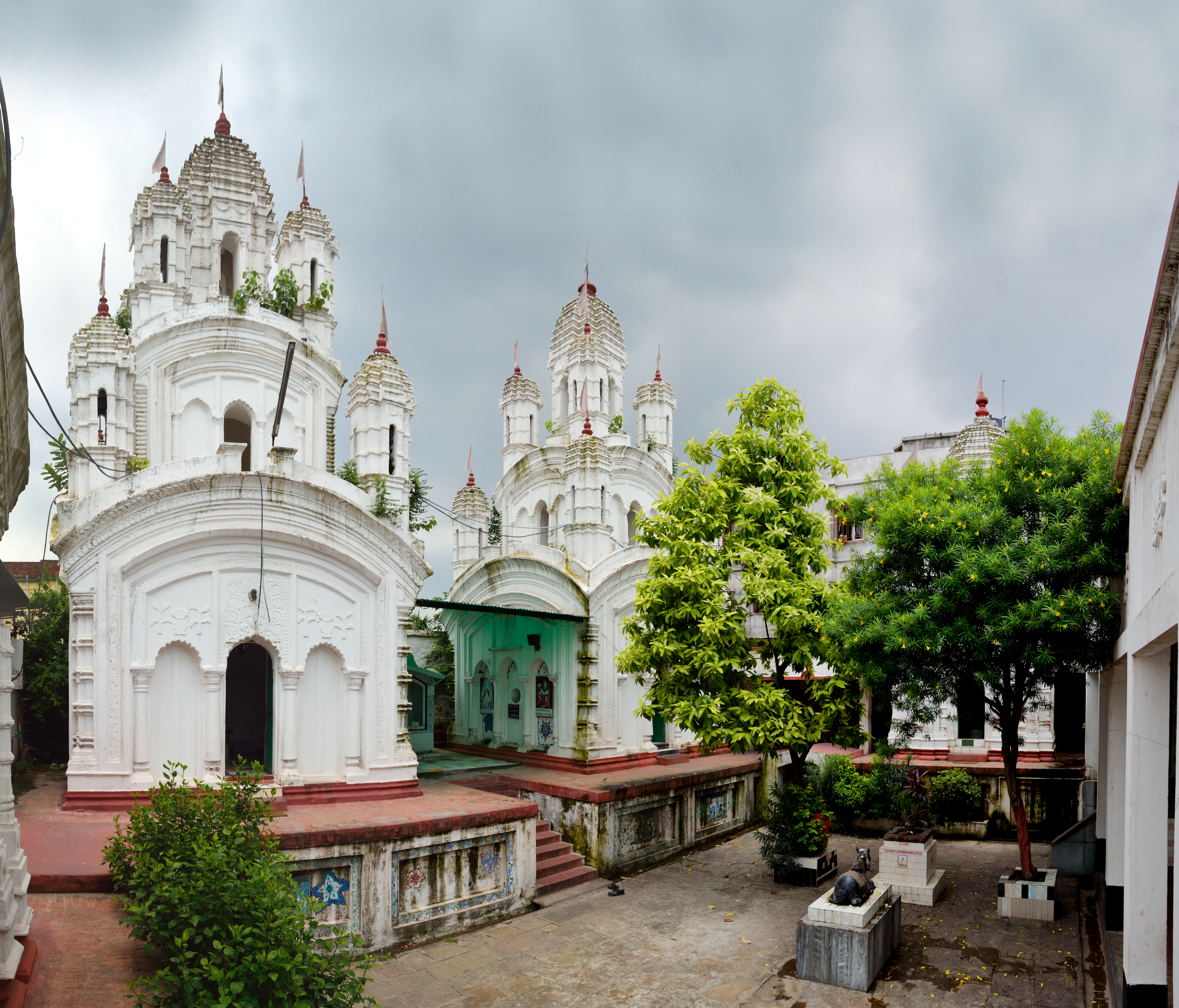
Char Mandir, Kazipara

Batai Chandi Temple (considered an avatar of Goddess Kali) and Char Mandir are other notable places of Shibpur.

== Recent developments ==
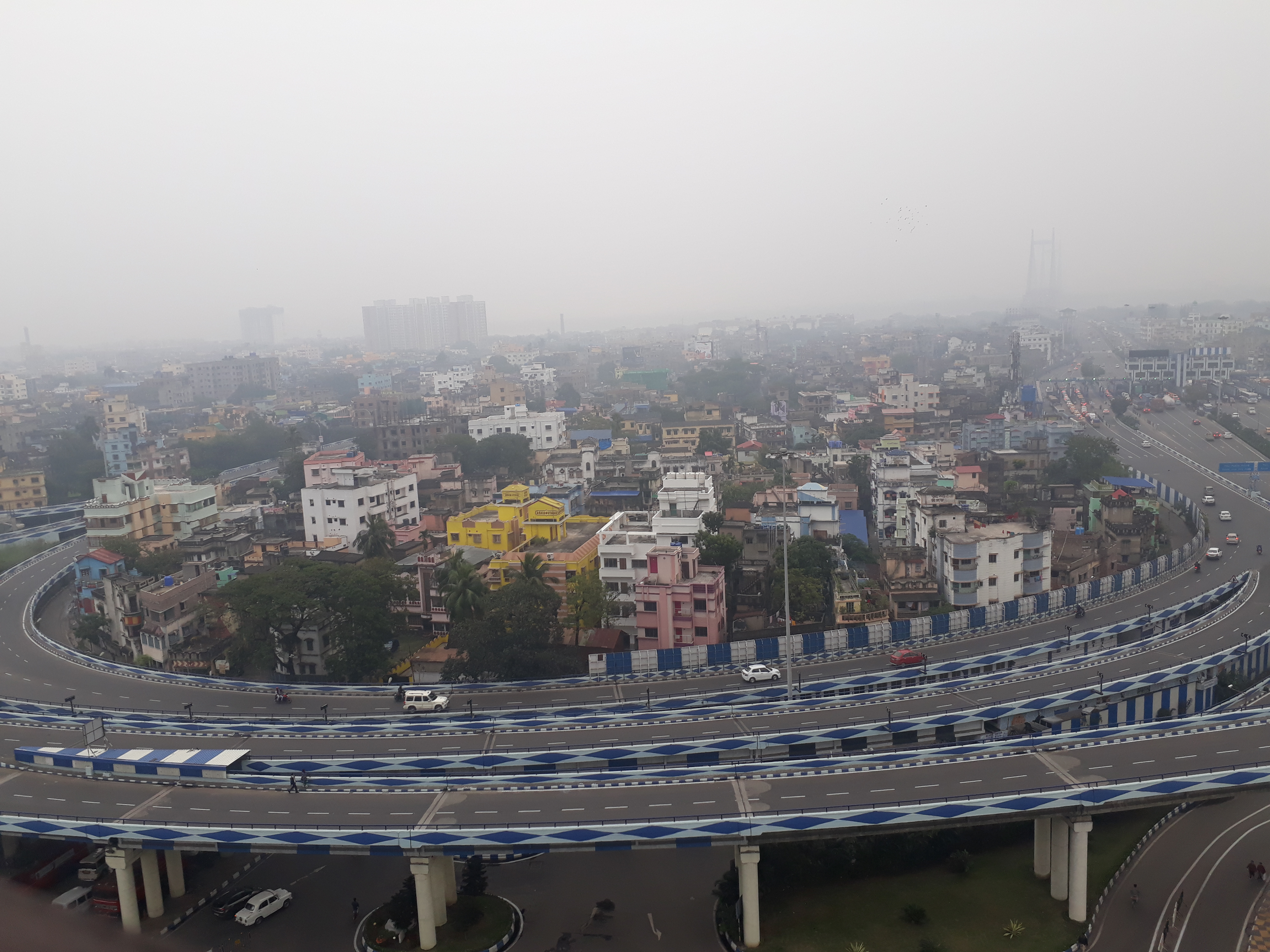
Flyovers approaching Vidyasagar Setu at Mandirtala

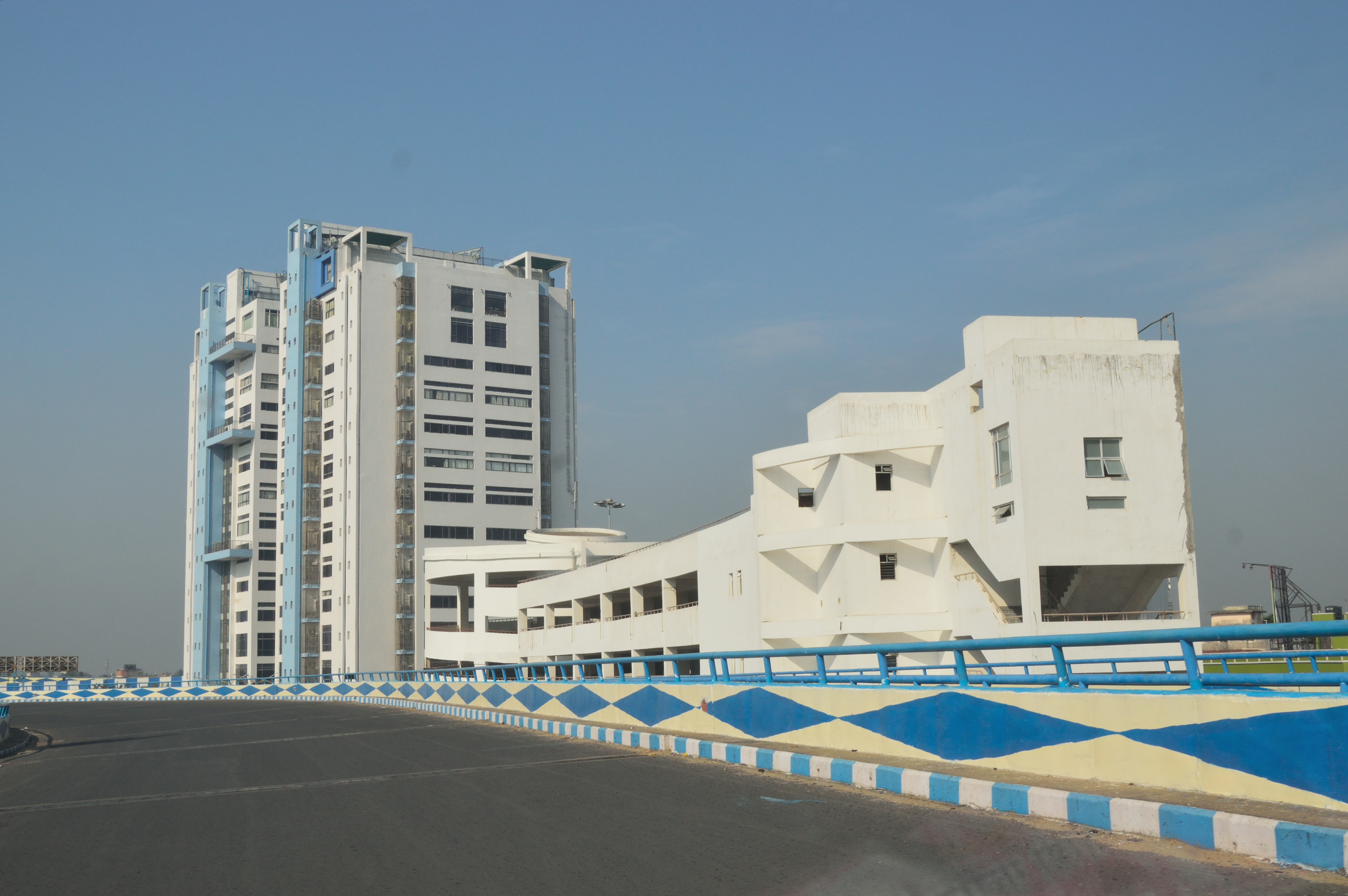
The HRBC Garment Park (Now Nabanna)

Before the Vidyasagar Setu project, a vast tract of land near used to be a marsh and was only dotted by few villages. This is in the distant past now after building the iconic bridge and the Kona expressway easily connecting the place with heart of Kolkata and the national highway and the industrial sector in Dasnagar.

Notably, the Kolkata Port was connected to the rest of India easier than the other existing route through Howrah Bridge and Bally bridge which are famous for their congested rush hour traffic. As a result of that, the place has good attention recently all over again. The town saw an immediate rush for land after the proposal for the bridge. Now various important buildings of the district are located in the town, namely the water purifying plant at Padmapukur, the Dumurjala Indoor Stadium and a good number of women's hockey clubs. The first Garment Park of Eastern India, initiated by the Hooghly River Bridge Commissioners (HRBC) is coming up at the approach to Vidyasagar Setu.

The secretariat of Mamata Banerjee-run West Bengal Government is shifted permanently to the Hooghly River Bridge Commissioners or HRBC made 16 storied with basement and ground floor the 'Garment Park' building popularly known as 'Nabanna' at Shibpur from 1 October 2013, as the restoration of 236-year-old Writers' Buildings is shortly for cost of Rs. 2,000 million.

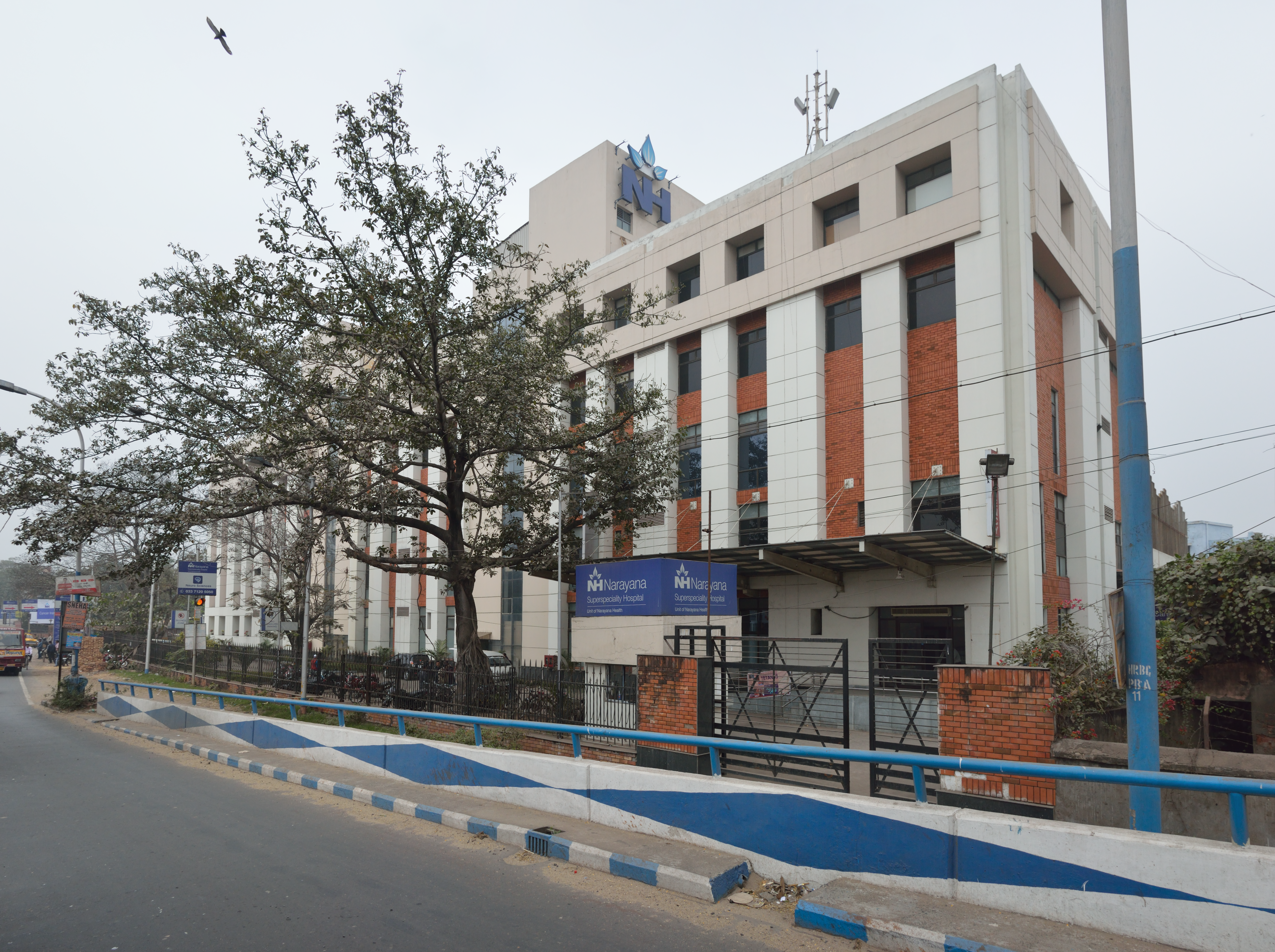
NH Narayana Superspeciality Hospital, Shalimar

Narayana Health group, led by Dr. Devi Prasad Shetty, launched NH Narayana Superspeciality Hospital at the Shalimar area of Shibpur (Andul Road). It is a reputed centre for oncology and cardiac sciences facilities in Eastern India. Its tertiary care services including cardiac surgery, neurology, neurosurgery, orthopaedics and Advanced Brachytherapy. The hospital provides an aggregate of 41 services along with a cancer support cell, which aims to raise funds for cancer patients, physiotherapy, nutrition, preventive health checks, counselling, emergency services and trauma care.

Shibpur is also geared towards luxury living with some big real estate projects like Ideal Grand, Clubtown Riverdale building up luxury apartments with plenty of open spaces and amenities of mini townships in old Tram Depot area and Shibpur market between G.T. Road and Foreshore Road. That place is currently occupied by dilapidated warehouses. Over the last ten years, Shibpur has developed into a popular residential community. Many multi-storied apartment complexes have been built (e.g. Shree Apartment - being one of the oldest, Vivek Vihar - the complex widely spread, Panchsheel Apartments) attracted by the location near the River Ganges, as well as by the easy connection to South Kolkata through the Vidyasagar Setu. Newly constructed roads have made access to the area very easy. Many parts have turned up as a transportation gateway to Kolkata.

Heavyweight transportation businesses are also growing in the Shalimar area.

== Culture ==
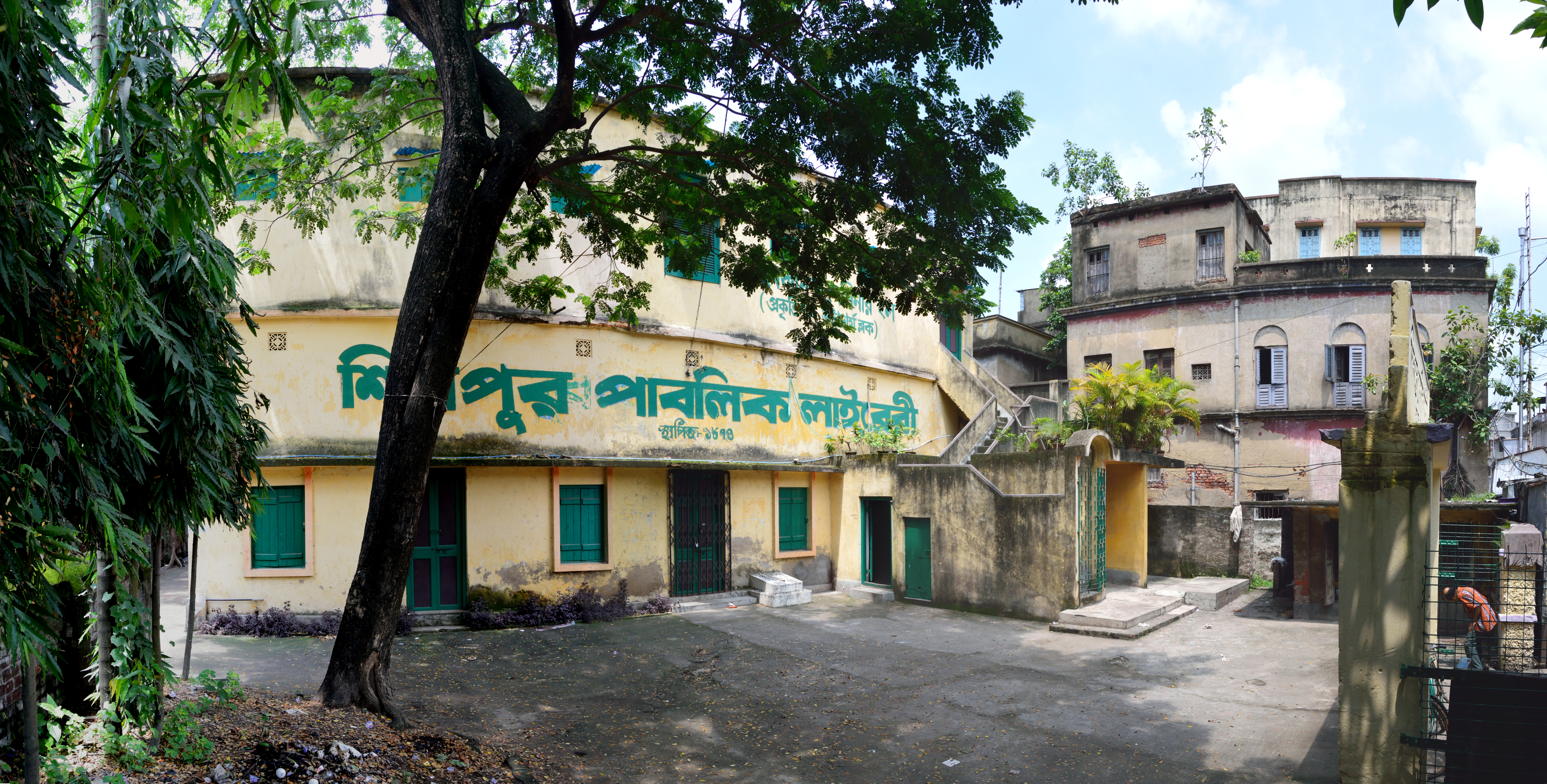
The Shibpur Public Library is one of the oldest libraries in Howrah

The eminent novelist Sarat Chandra Chattopadhyay lived in Baje Shibpur, alias Bajiye Shibpur, meaning the musicians Shibpur, north of Shibpur. The linguist Suniti Kumar Chatterji was born in this place. Kisari Mohan Ganguli, the author of the first complete English translation of the Sanskrit epic Mahabharata (1883–1893), also lived in Shibpur.

Shibpur is notorious for its narrow lanes and high density built uptown space.

Shibpur has a chequered history in the field of culture. The residents of this place are well known for their interest in music, the arts and literature.

Many luminaries of West Bengal in the fields of sports and athletics reside here. The only indoor stadium in Howrah, the Dumurjala Indoor Stadium, is located in the western fringe of Shibpur (Dumurjala) on Dr. Bholanath Chakraborty Sarani (Formerly Drainage Canal Road).

The legacy of the late master sarod player Bahadur Hossain Khan is continued through the "Ustad Ayet Ali Khan Sangeet Niketon" (Ustad Ayet Ali Khan Memorial School of Music) - a music school in memory of his father Ayet Ali Khan - in Shibpur.

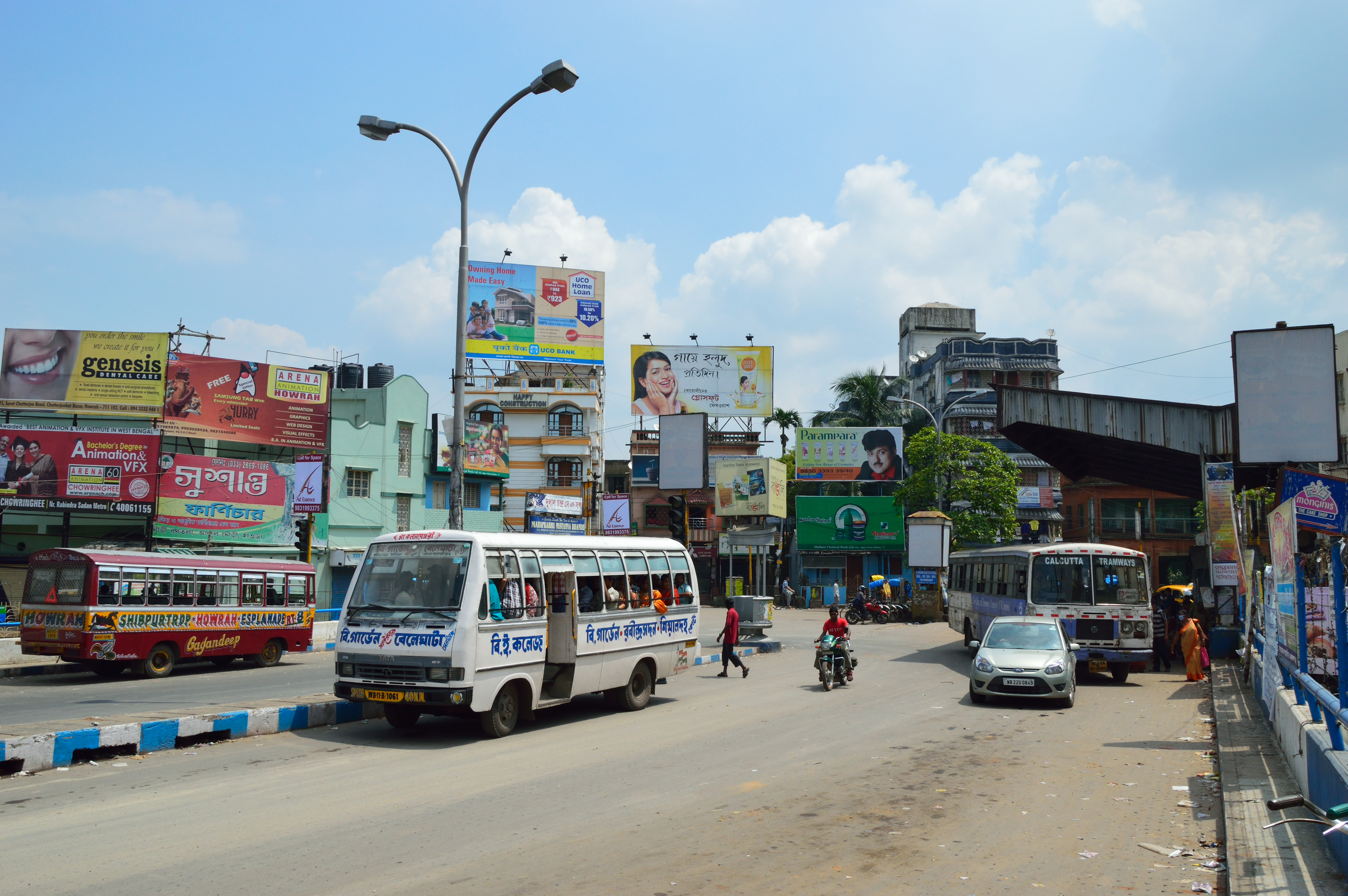
Mandirtala Bus Stoppage

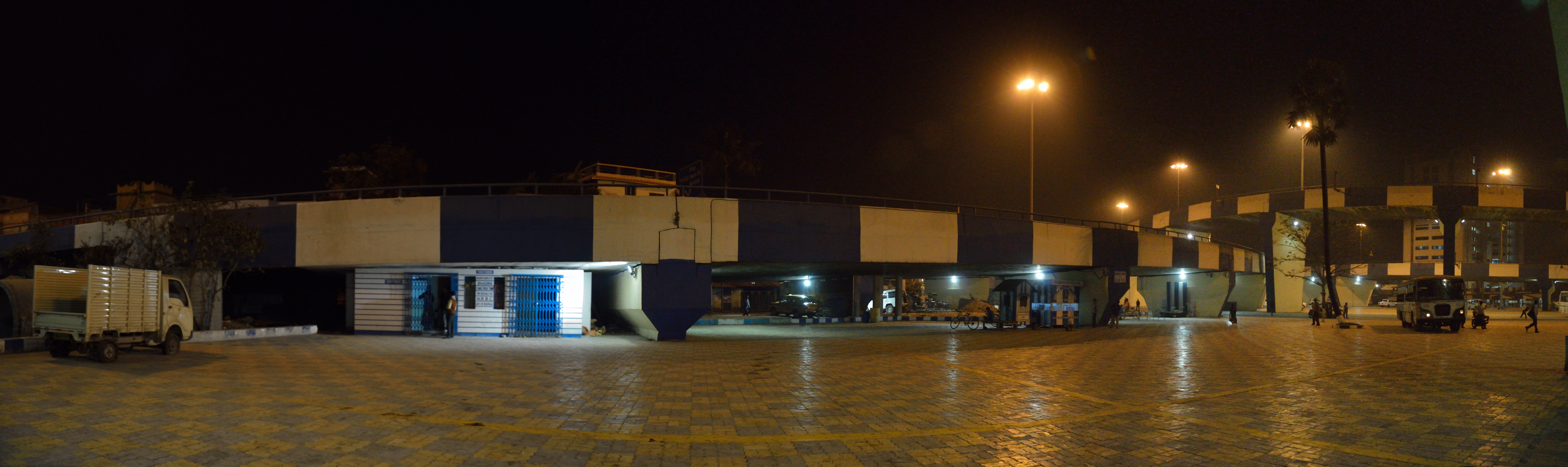
Nabanna Bus Terminus

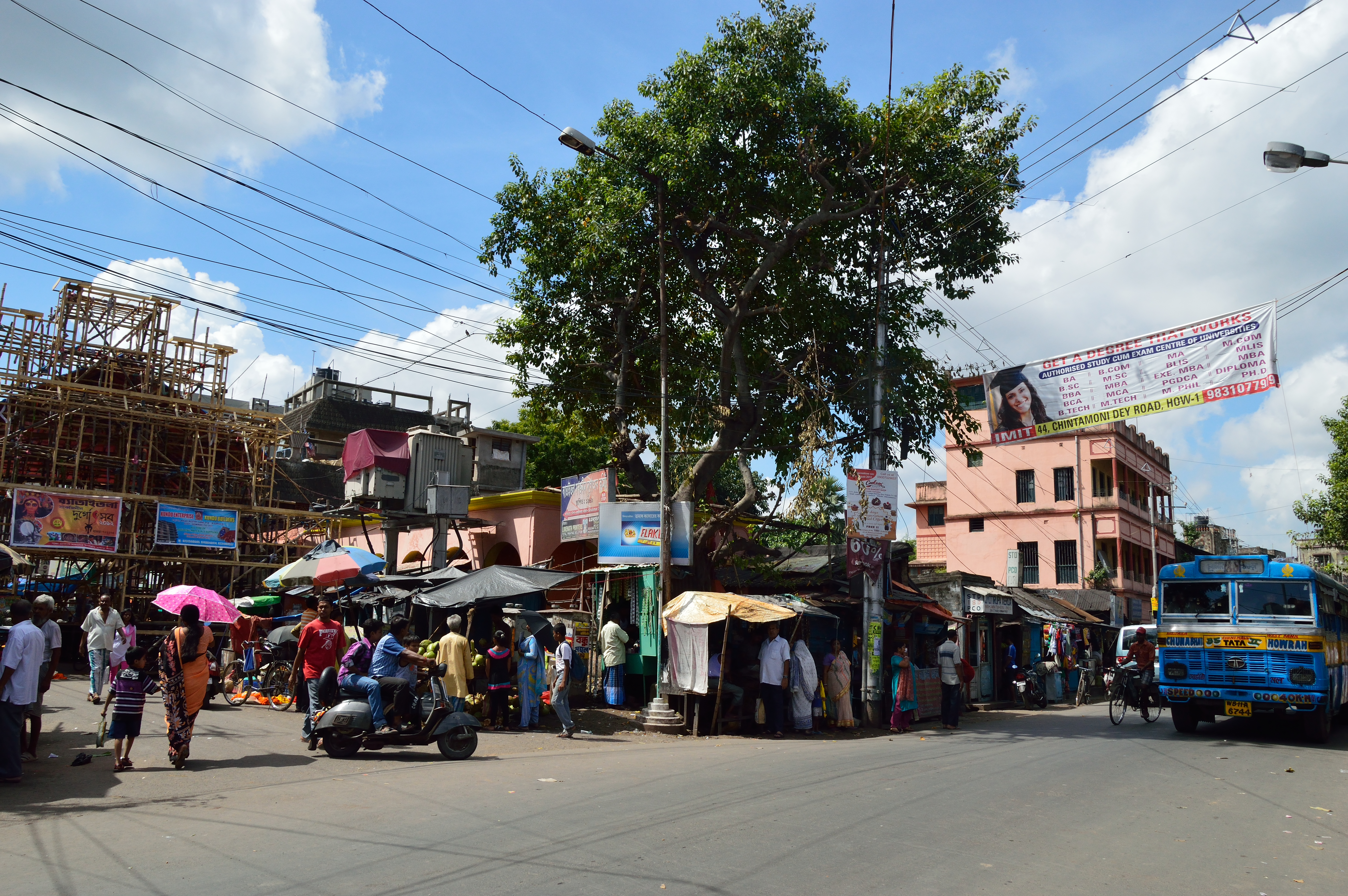
Grand Trunk Road (part of SH 6), Bataitala

== Popular areas ==
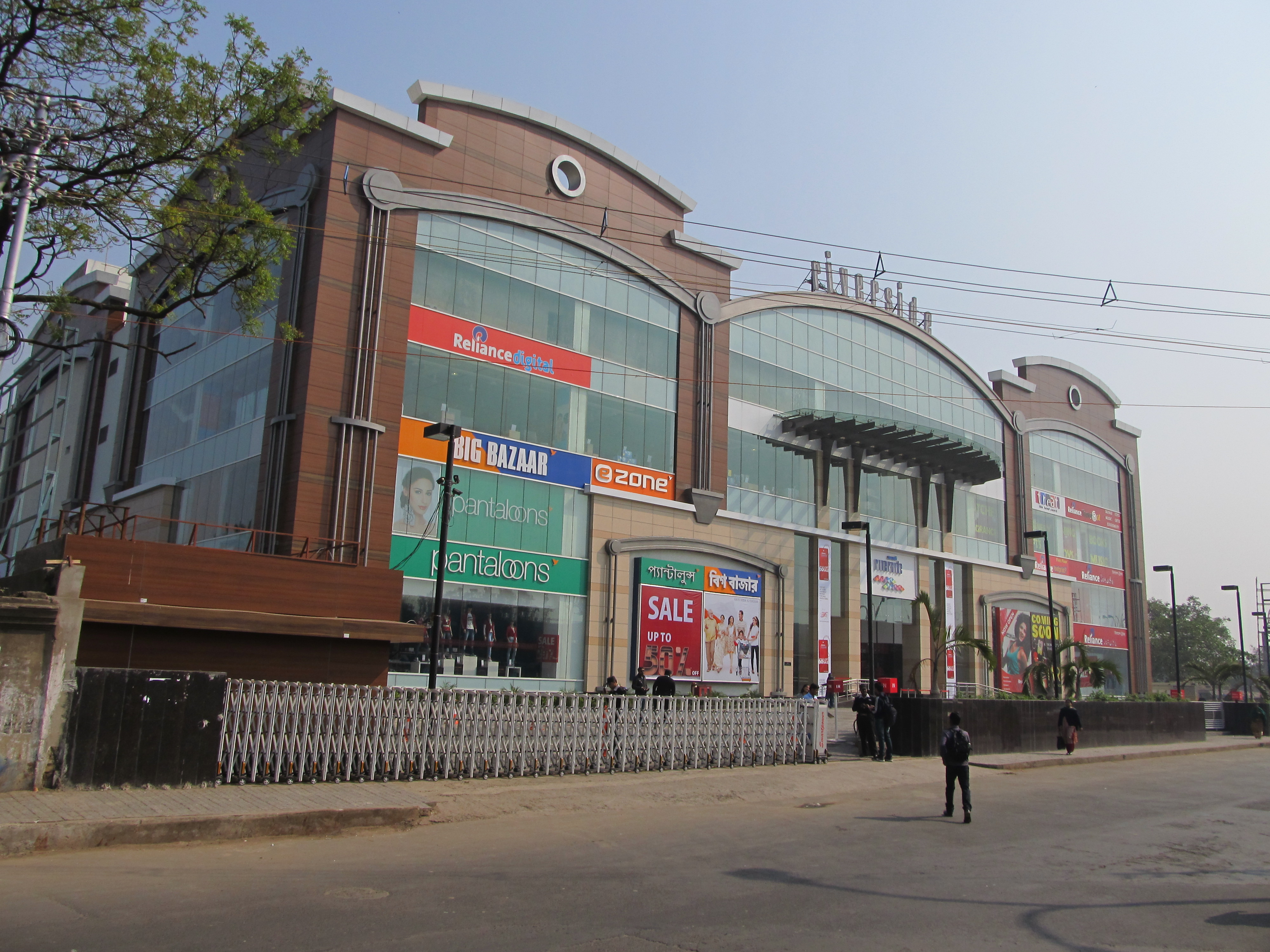
Avani Riverside Mall, Kazipara

Being a largely populated city Shibpur has its share of areas and places that play the role of landmarks and "hangout" points, such as Mandirtala, the Shibpur entrance to the Vidyasagar Setu, a very popular jogging track and rendezvous point. It was named 'Mandirtala' due to two popular Mandirs of Shiva situated here. Nearby popular places are Sashthitala, Shibpur Bazar, Hajar Hath Kalitala, Mallick Phatak, Dumurjala Indoor Stadium etc. Shibpur Bazaar is a busy marketplace, where most of Shibpur's shops and stalls are located.

Besides Mandirtala and Nabanna Bus Terminus, Buses ply along Grand Trunk Road/Andul Road (part of State Highway 6), Foreshore Road, Jagat Banerjee Ghat Road, College Road/Botanical Garden Road, Kona Expressway and Netaji Subhash Road in Shibpur. The nearest railway station Shalimar is a terminus station for South Eastern Railway and also has a port near it. The Shalimar port is even older than the Kolkata port made by the colonial rulers. Shalimar port was in function during the Mughal Empire, which was connected to the rest of the country with Grand Trunk Road. One manufacturing unit of the second largest Paint Company, Berger Paints is situated here.

The largest mall-cum-multiplex of Howrah, Avani Riverside Mall on the west bank of Hooghly River is located here (on Jagat Banerjee Ghat Road). It was launched in 2012 and has a gross leasable area of 6 lakh square feet.

There are many schools and colleges in Shibpur. One of the best institutions in India Bengal Engineering College, the second oldest engineering college, was given the status of a university, making it the first university in Howrah. It was renamed as Bengal Engineering and Science University, Shibpur in 2004, in recognition of its contributions for more than 150 years. This engineering university was transformed into the Indian Institute of Engineering Science and Technology, Shibpur (an Institute of National Importance) in 2014 by the Government of India. Shibpur Dinobundhoo Institution (College) is one of the best colleges of Howrah district. Shibpur Hindu Girls High School, B. K. Paul's Institution, Shibpur Srimat Swami Projnanananda Saraswati Vidyalaya, Howrah Vivekananda Institution, Shibpur Bhabani Balika Vidyalaya, Shree Jain vidhyalaya, Maria's day school, St. John's high school, Heritage Academy high School and B. E. College Model School are some of the well known schools in this area.
