= Acharya Jagadish Chandra Bose Indian Botanic Garden =

Botanic garden in Calcutta

Calcutta Botanic Garden
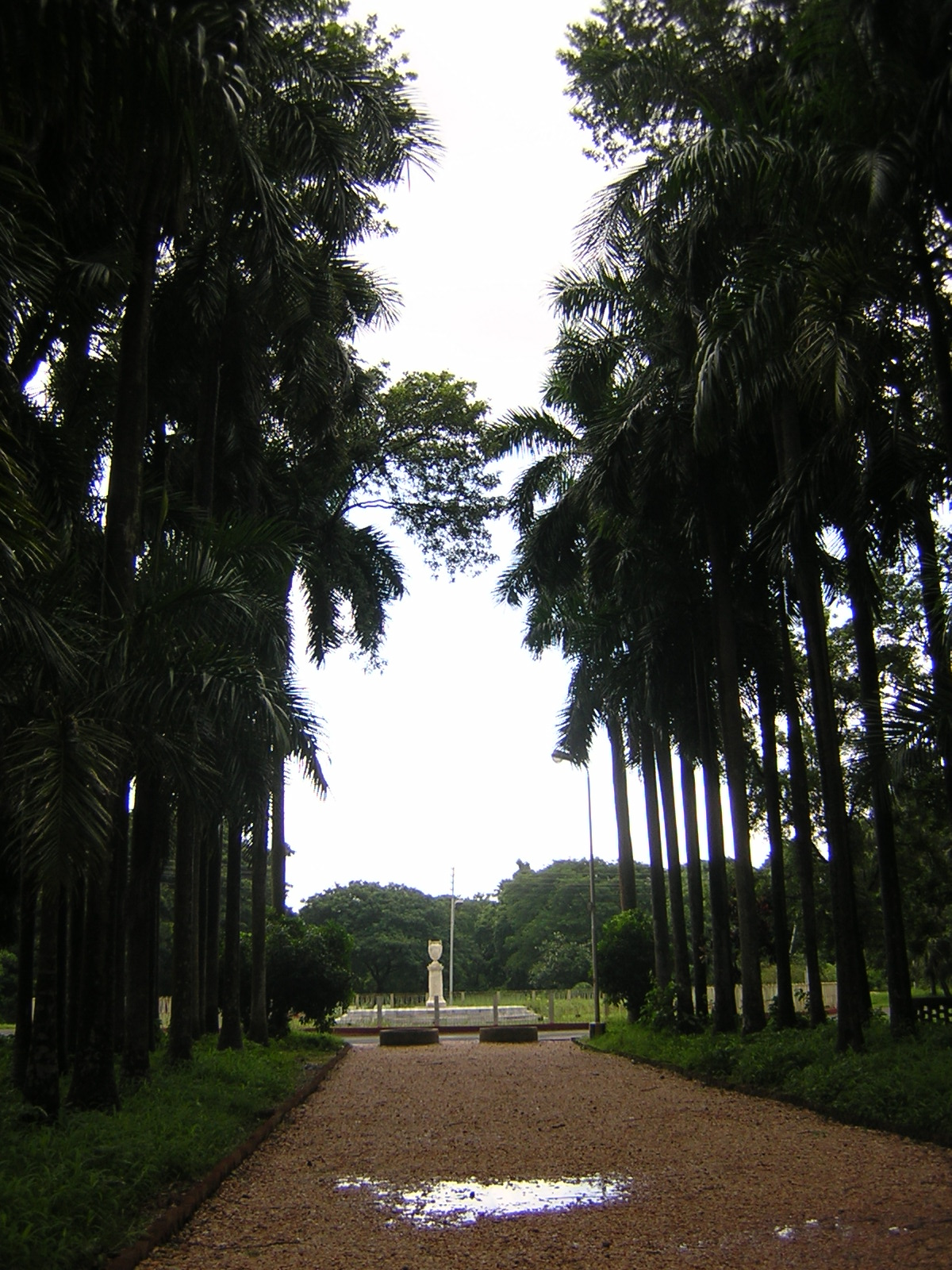
- Interactive map of Calcutta Botanic Garden
- Type: Public
- Location: Shibpur, Howrah
- Nearest city: Howrah, Kolkata
- Area: 109 hectares (270 acres)
- Created: 1787; 239 years ago
- Designer: Robert Kyd, William Roxburgh
- Operator: Botanical Survey of India
- Status: Open (5 am – 7 am for morning walkers) (9 am – 5 pm for visitors)
- Website: Official website

The Acharya Jagadish Chandra Bose Indian Botanic Garden, previously known as the Indian Botanic Garden, Calcutta Botanic Garden, and Royal Botanic Garden, Calcutta, is a botanical garden situated in Shibpur, Howrah near Kolkata. The garden houses a wide variety of rare plants boasting of a total collection of over 12,000 specimens spread over 109 hectares. It is managed by the Botanical Survey of India (BSI) under the Ministry of Environment and Forests, Government of India.

== History ==
Lt. Colonel Robert Kyd first made the proposal for a botanic garden in Calcutta in 1786. By then, biologist Carl Linnaeus had already provided framework towards a systematic study of plants worldwide. Kyd's proposal coincided with the East India Company's interest in improving agricultural output and expanding production of cash crops. The former interest was due to the great famine India was facing then due to British colonial expansion. The latter was a result of the economic crises the company was facing. Thereby, Kyd's proposal to the acting Governor-General John Macpherson was motivated by the desire to increase agricultural revenue in an effort to end food scarcity and promote economic growth.

Company officials also deemed it necessary to engage with experiment and research in the fledgling colony. After Kyd sent two long letters to the Bengal Presidency government, the garden was established in 1786 in less than three decades after the Kew Gardens were created in London. In his written proposal to the Governor-General, Kyd had stated it was "not for the purpose of collecting rare plants as things of mere curiosity, but for establishing a stock for disseminating such articles as may prove beneficial to the inhabitants as well to the natives of Great Britain, and which ultimately may tend to the extension of the national commerce and riches." Kyd wanted to encourage identifying new plants of commercial value, such as teak, and spices. The new Governor-General Lord Cornwallis agreed to Kyd's proposal and asked him to pursue the establishment of the garden as the former was confident of its approval from London. The East India Company officially authorised the garden in July 1787. By then, Kyd had already selected a site spanning 310 acres.

Furthermore, Robert Kyd was accustomed to growing various spices from the East Indies, which were obtained from East India Company's expansionist voyages. The East India Company's Court of Directors supported Kyd's ambitions to establish cinnamon, tobacco, dates, Chinese tea, and coffee in the Garden due to its economic benefits. Tea, for example, was a highly commodified plant and indispensable to the European economy. The indigenous tea plants of India were still not able produced in mass quantities, leading to the kidnapping of Chinese gardeners and their tea plants. Chinese tea was first transplanted to the Calcutta Garden and larger tea plantations in Ooty and the Nilgiris were established by forcing the people of Assam and Ooty to relocate. Additionally, Cacti such as nopal were imported from Mexico and established in the Garden to produce textile dyes, an industry which Spain dominated.

A major change in policy, however, was introduced by the botanist William Roxburgh after he became superintendent of the garden in 1793. Roxburgh brought in plants from all over India and developed an extensive herbarium. This collection of dried plant specimens eventually became the Central National Herbarium of the Botanical Survey of India, which comprises 2,500,000 items. During the early years of the garden Joseph Dalton Hooker writes:

... contributed more useful and ornamental tropical plants to the public and private gardens of the world than any other establishment before or since. ... I here allude to the great Indian herbarium, chiefly formed by the staff of the Botanic Gardens under the direction of Dr. Nathaniel Wallich, and distributed in 1829 to the principal museums of Europe.

=== Botany and power ===
The Calcutta Botanic Garden played a significant role in the intersection of botanical science and colonial power in British India. As a center for plant research and cultivation, it became an important tool for scientific advancement and economic development. However, its functions were closely tied to the political and economic goals of the British East India Company. This section explores how the garden's scientific pursuits were intertwined with colonial expansion and governance, highlighting the complex relationship between botany and imperial power in the late 18th and 19th centuries.

==== Colonial Botanical Network ====
The Calcutta Botanic Garden was part of a large network of scientific institutions, including the Singapore Botanic Gardens and Saint Vincent and the Grenadines Botanic Gardens. This network moved plants between gardens and classified them using the Linnaean system. It supported scientific research and was also used in colonial expansion.

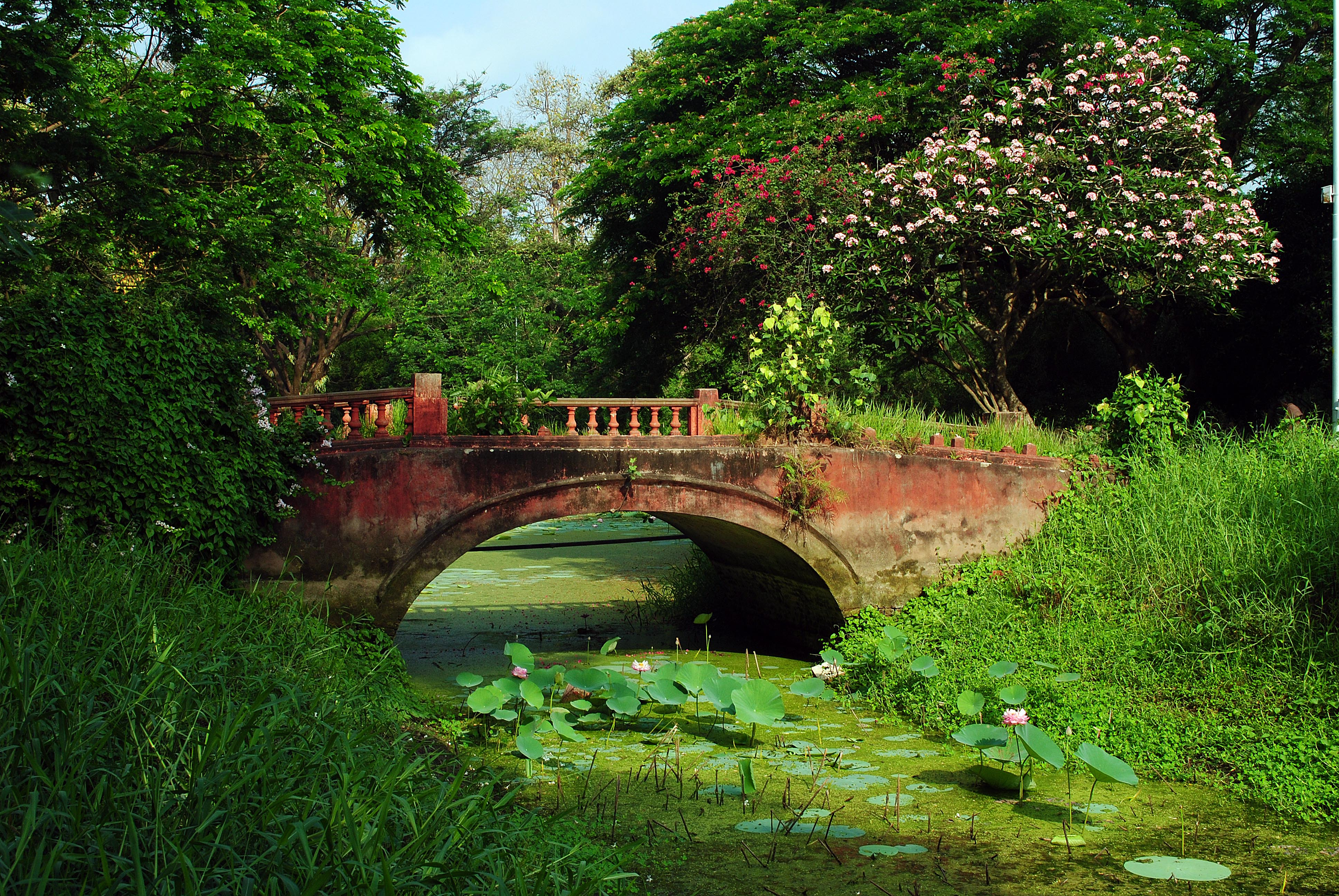
Old bridge inside the Botanical Garden

==== East India Company's role ====
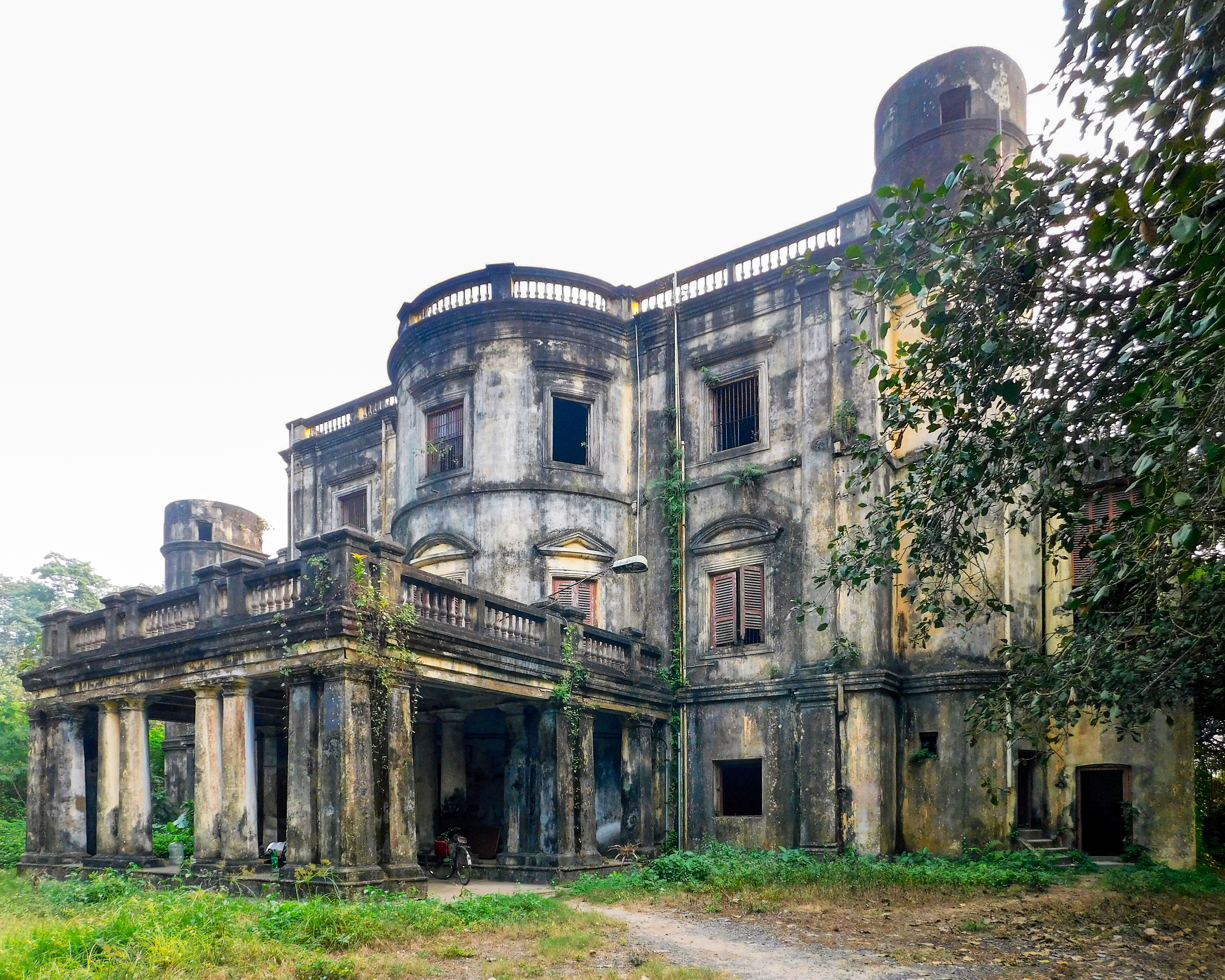
Roxburgh's House

The East India Company went through major political changes while developing its botanical work. The East India Company Act 1784 (24 Geo. 3. Sess. 2. c. 25) put the company under British Government rule, but it still had governing power. From 1786-1787, it ruled together with the Nawabs of Bengal. As the company gained more control over farming in South Asia, it did a lot of scientific research, including plant surveys. These surveys had two main goals:

- To estimate how much money valuable plants could make
- To show why the company should be involved in governing

Although it was a trading company, the East India Company had powers like a government, including collecting taxes. Its system kept officials separate from farmers. Both Indian and British officials were involved, and the Court of Directors watched over this to try to keep it fair.

==== Key figures and scientific exploration ====
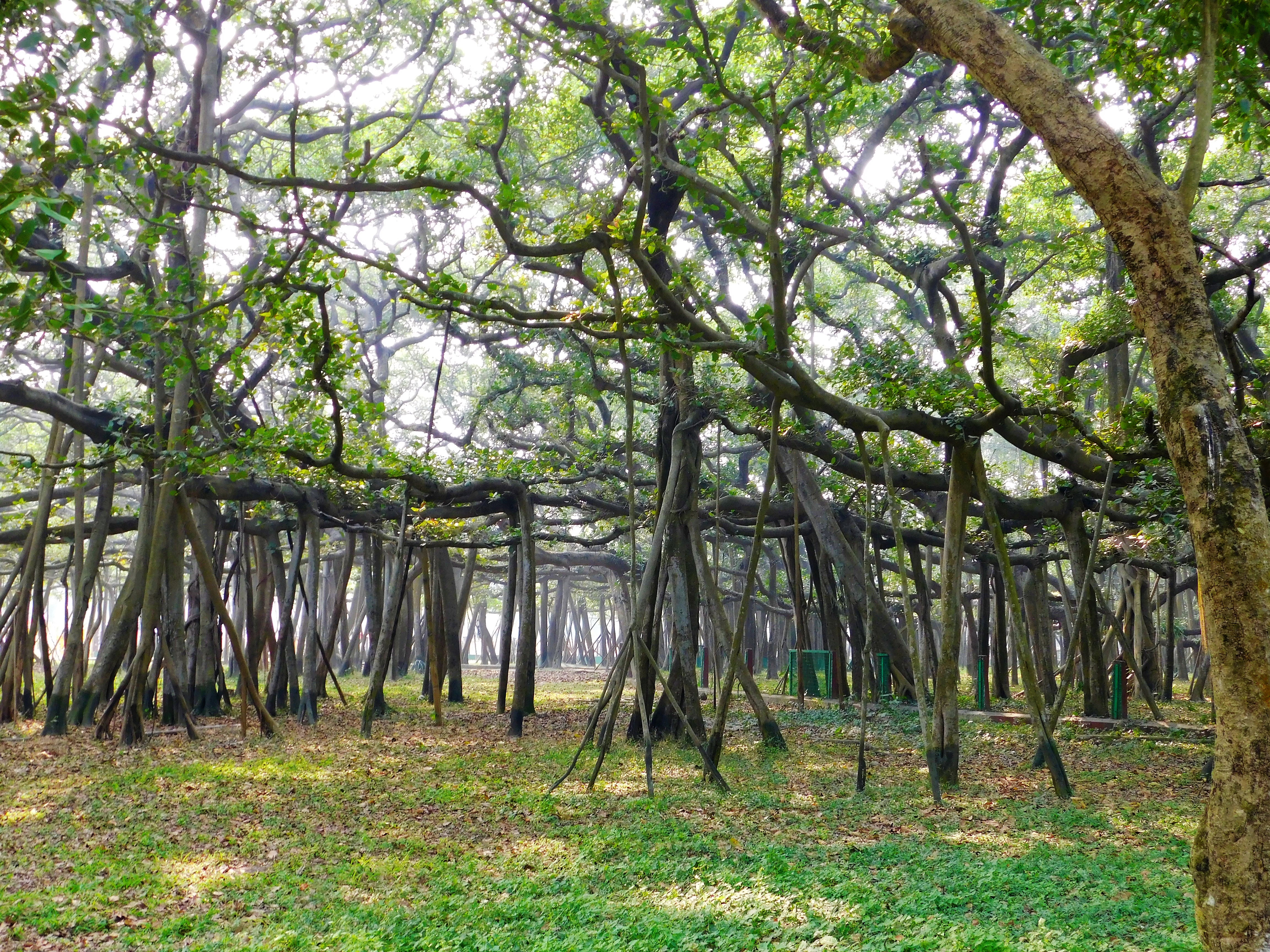
Guinness World Records holder, this 250 years old banyan tree with 3616 prop roots is spread across 1.6 Hectares

More and more plant scientists were able to study new areas in India, collecting lots of information. Important people who worked at the Calcutta Garden were:

- William Roxburgh: Made important changes as the garden's leader
- Nathaniel Wallich: Took over after Roxburgh
- William Griffith: A well-known plant scientist who did research at the garden

==== Changes over time ====
The Calcutta Botanic Garden changed a lot since it was first set up. It made beautiful gardens for people to visit while still studying plants. In the 1970s, the Garden started growing better food plants and other useful plants for India. This shows how the Garden started to focus more on helping the country and its people.

=== Calcutta Botanic Garden layout ===
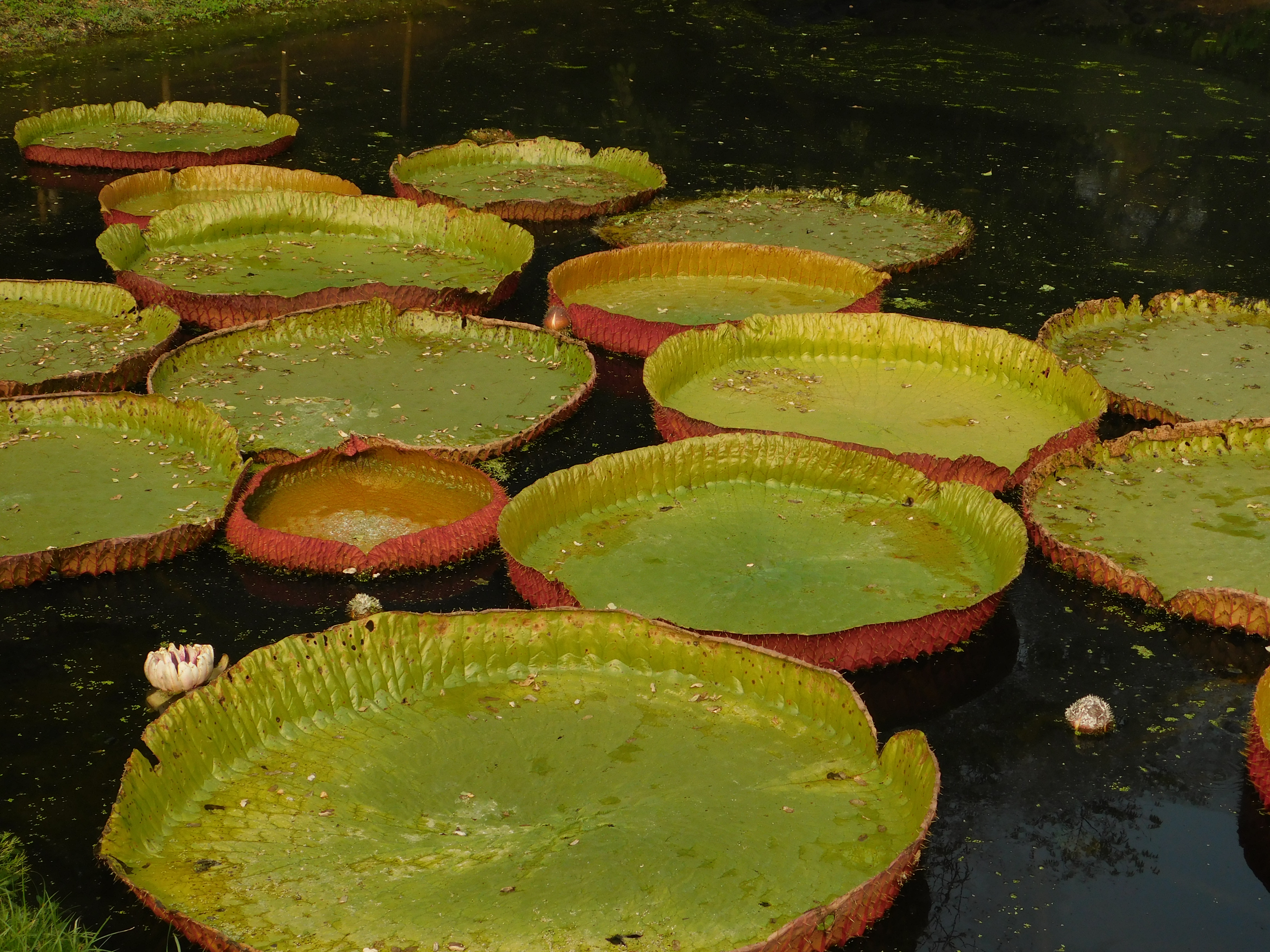
Great Water Lilly

Griffith was instrumental in rearranging the Calcutta Garden in a way that reflected scientific practice at the time, emphasizing the importance of scientific classification in the Garden's appearance. Griffith often criticized the layout of the Botanic Garden under Wallich's control as he believed it did not have the qualities of a traditional European garden. These qualities included "uniformity of design, adaptation of particular parts to particular purposes, including those of science and instruction." The ways in which the Garden was restructured from 1816 to 1846 reflected the demands of a rapidly growing scientific field that fueled European colonial influence. Key features of the 1816 map depict four nurseries, housing for laborers, a farm, and a small Linnaean Garden. The map titled "Plan of the Botanical Gardens December 1845" was developed in 1843 by Griffith and shows key differences compared to the 1816 plan created by Wallich. Major illustrations of natural features such as rivers and trees, which appeared alongside the nurseries, are either not included in the map or depicted using symbols. A large teak plantation replaces the native housing and the landscape is clearly divided into large divisions, indicating that science was used to categorize the natural landscape. An emphasis was placed on labelling plants and categorizing the different areas of the Garden which, according to Griffith, allowed it to be "gardens of science and instruction."

== Attractions ==
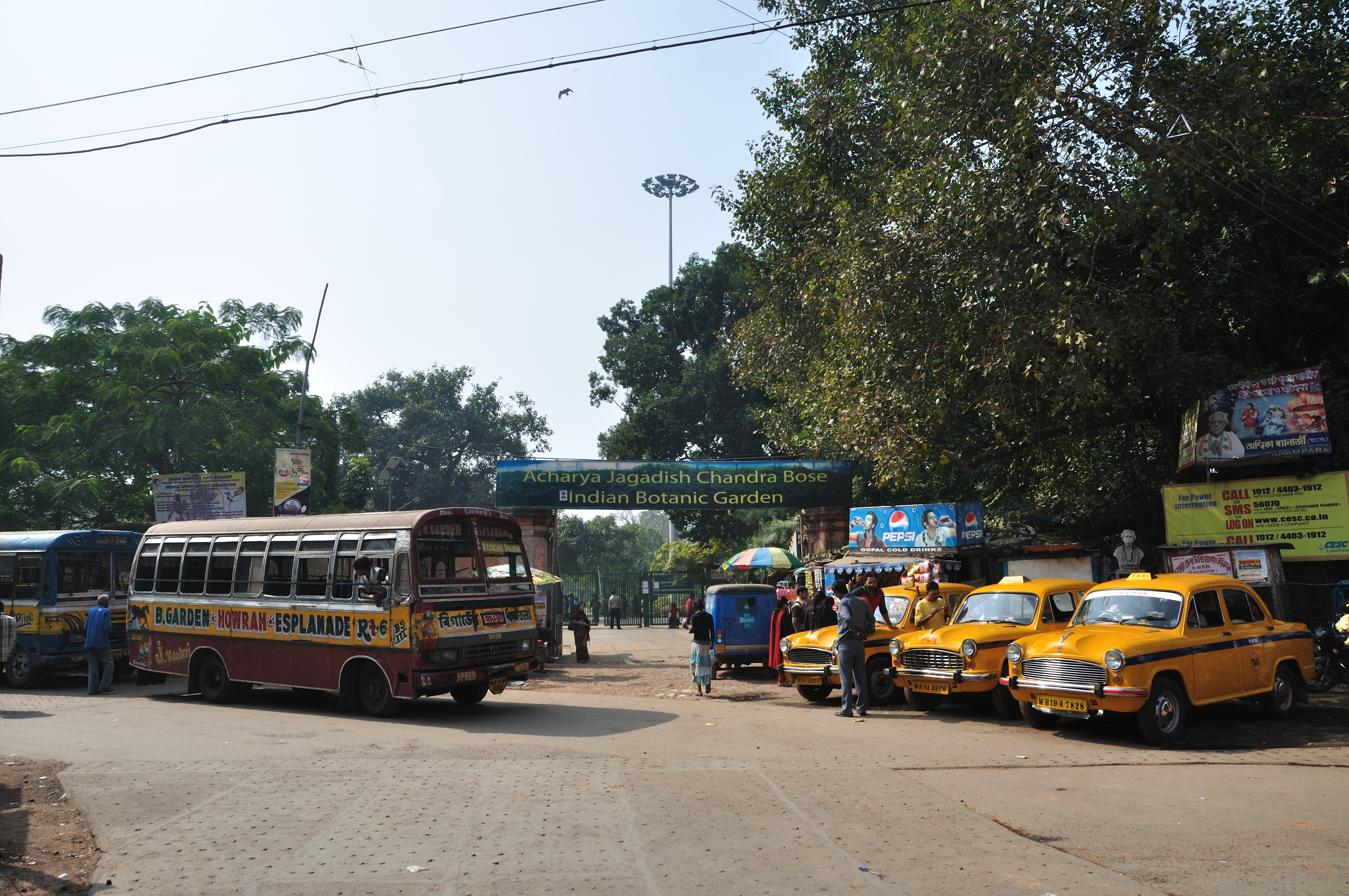
Outside View of Shibpur Botanic Garden

The best-known landmark of the garden is The Great Banyan, an enormous banyan tree (Ficus benghalensis) that is reckoned to be the largest tree in the world, at more than 330 metres in circumference. It partially inspired the novel Hothouse by Brian Aldiss. The gardens are also famous for their enormous collections of orchids, bamboos, palms, and plants of the screw pine genus (Pandanus).

Animals seen inside the Botanic Garden include the Jackal (Canis aureus), Indian mongoose and the Indian Fox (Vulpes bengalensis). Many species of snake are also to be found in the garden.

== Legacy ==
Joseph Dalton Hooker says of this Botanical Garden that "Amongst its greatest triumphs may be considered the introduction of the tea-plant from China ... the establishment of the tea-trade in the Himalaya and Assam is almost entirely the work of the superintendents of the gardens of Calcutta and Seharunpore (Saharanpur)."

== Gallery ==
The Kings Lake from the Banyan avenue
