= James Kyd =

Master ship builder of East India Company

- Born: 1786
- Died: 26 October 1836 (aged 49–50)
- Occupation: Ship builder

James Kyd (1786 – 26 October 1836) was a Master ship builder of the East India Company in Calcutta, Bengal Presidency, India.

== Life ==
James Kyd was born in 1786 in India to Major Alexander Kyd, a lieutenant general and the Surveyor General of Bengal and his brother is Robert Kyd, a British Army officer. Kyd went to Great Britain to learn shipbuilding and returned to India in 1800 to work as an apprentice to A. Wadell. He succeeded Wadell in 1807 to become the Master ship builder of the East India Company in Calcutta (now, Kolkata). Kyd built various steamers and yachts for the Bengal government and other countries for personal and trading purposes. A collection of few are given below:

Year	Name	Comment	Ref(s)
1808	Phoenix	Yacht, 187 tons, sold to the government	
1811	Maitland	634 tons, sold for free trade	
1812	Castle Huntly	1276 tons, built for China	
1813	General Kyd	1279 tons	
1814	Lord Hungerford	685 tons	
1815	East Indian (1815 ship)	553 tons, was lost in 1826 at Saugor Sand	
1816	Mary Ann	587 tons	

In 1814, the Admiralty and Court of Directors sent honors and appreciative testimonial to Kyd for the repair work done to HMS Semiramis at St. Helena. Most of the ships were launched from the Kidderpore docks.

He died on 26 October 1836 due to a knee injury, and was interred at the Scotch Burial Ground.
