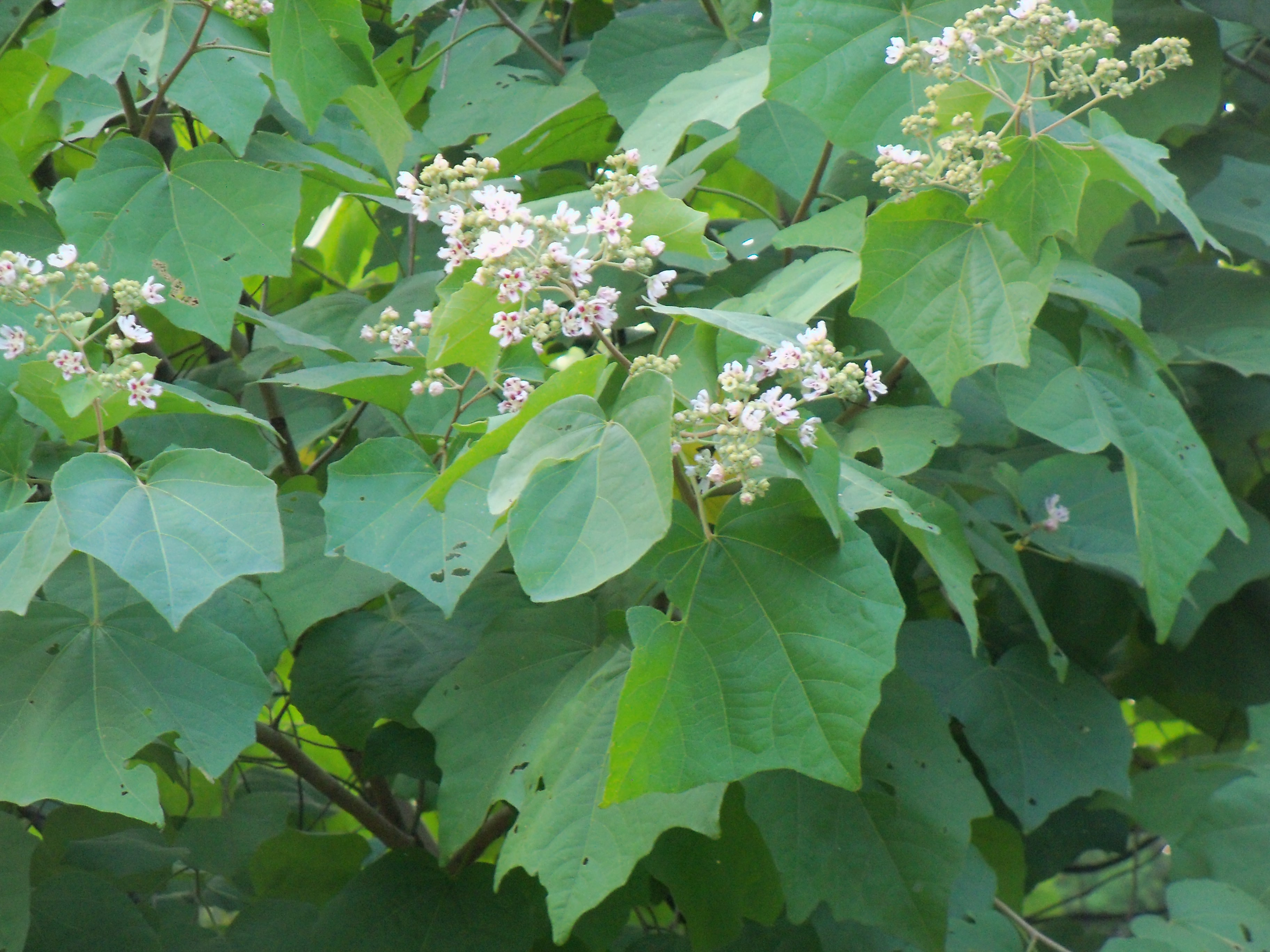
- Kydia calycina

Scientific classification
- Kingdom: Plantae
- Clade: Embryophytes
- Clade: Tracheophytes
- Clade: Angiosperms
- Clade: Eudicots
- Clade: Rosids
- Order: Malvales
- Family: Malvaceae
- Subfamily: Malvoideae
- Tribe: Hibisceae
- Genus: Kydia; Roxb.

Species
- See text

= Kydia =

Genus of flowering plants

Kydia is a genus of flowering plants in the family Malvaceae, found in the Indian subcontinent, southern China and Southeast Asia. Some sources consider it to be monotypic, with Kydia calycina the only species; certainly K. calycina is the best‑studied species, as it is widely exploited, even cultivated, for timber and fiber.

== Species ==
Currently accepted species include:

- Kydia calycina Roxb.
- Kydia glabrescens Mast.
