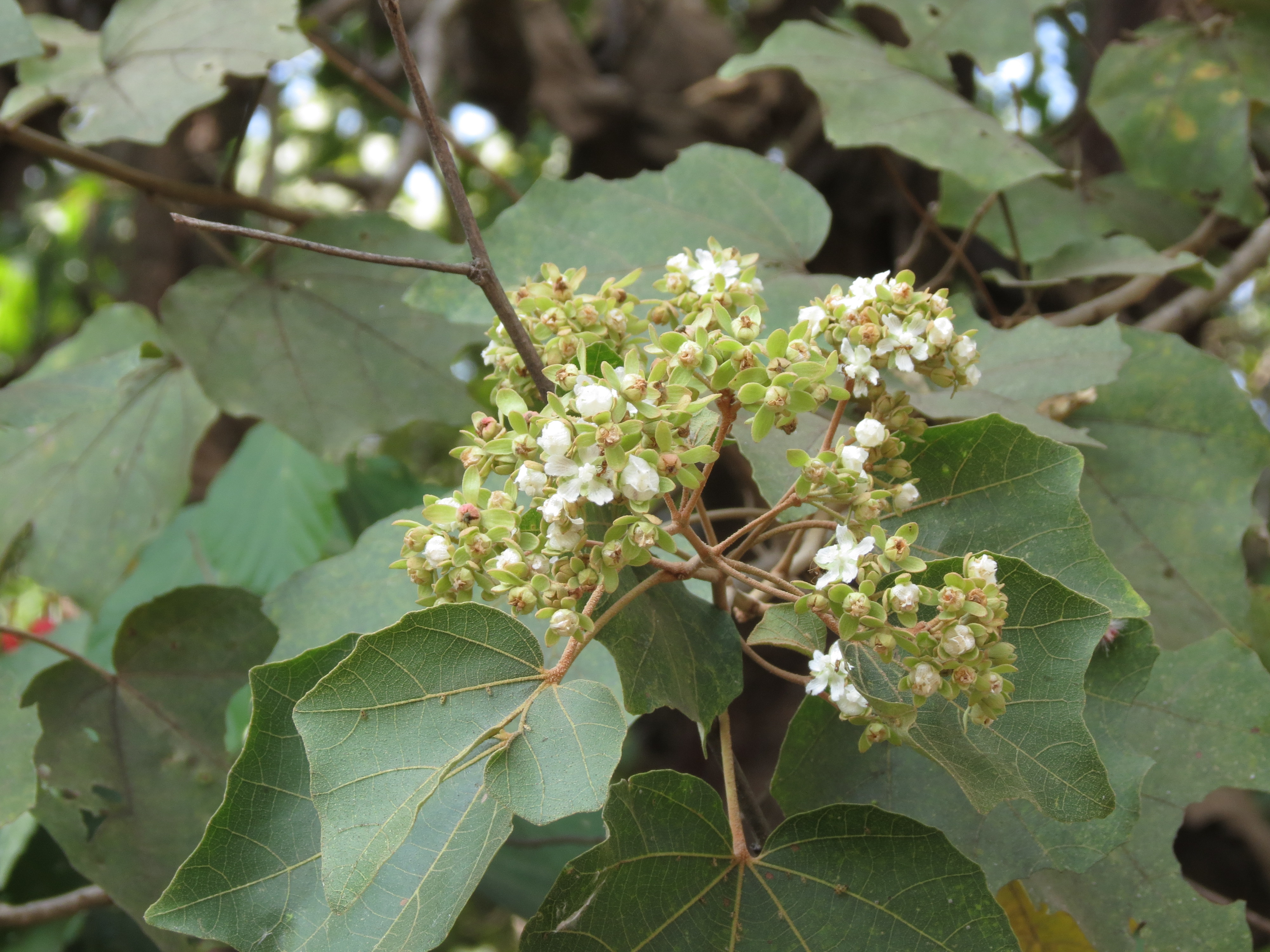

Scientific classification
- Kingdom: Plantae
- Clade: Embryophytes
- Clade: Tracheophytes
- Clade: Angiosperms
- Clade: Eudicots
- Clade: Rosids
- Order: Malvales
- Family: Malvaceae
- Genus: Kydia
- Species: K. calycina

Binomial name
- Kydia calycina Roxb.

Synonyms
- List: Hibiscus roxburghianus (Wight) Mabb.; Kydia fraterna Roxb.; Kydia roxburghiana Wight

= Kydia calycina =

Species of flowering plant

Kydia calycina is a species of flowering plant in the genus Kydia found in the Indian subcontinent, southern China and Southeast Asia. A fast‑growing, medium‑sized tree, it is widely exploited, even cultivated, for cheap timber and fiber.
