= Banupur =

- Census Town
- Location in West Bengal, India Banupur (India)
- Coordinates: 22.567098°N 88.25386°E
- Country: India
- State: West Bengal
- District: Howrah

Population (2011)
  - Total: 9,626

Languages
  - Official: Bengali, English
- Time zone: UTC+5:30 (IST)
- Vehicle registration: WB
- Lok Sabha constituency: Howrah
- Vidhan Sabha constituency: Sankrail
- Website: howrah.gov.in

Banupur is a census town in Sankrail CD Block of Howrah Sadar subdivision in Howrah district in the Indian state of West Bengal.

== Demographics ==
As per 2011 Census of India Banupur had a total population of 9,626 of which 5,210 (54%) were males and 4,416 (46%) were females. Population below 6 years was 1,251. The total number of literates in Banupur was 6,401 (76.43% of the population over 6 years).

Banupur was part of Kolkata Urban Agglomeration in 2011 census.

As of 2001 India census, Banupur had a population of 11,645. Males constitute 63% of the population and females 37%. Banupur has an average literacy rate of 66%, higher than the national average of 59.5%; with 69% of the males and 31% of females literate. 9% of the population is under 6 years of age.

== Personality ==
The family of the renowned artist Nandalal Bose belonged to Banupur. He used to visit Banupur regularly.

== Transport ==
Satyen Bose Road (Sankrail Station Road) is the artery of the town.

=== Bus ===
==== Private Bus ====
- 69 Sankrail railway station - Howrah Station

==== Mini Bus ====
- 24 Sankrail railway station - Howrah Station

==== Bus Routes Without Numbers ====
- Sankrail railway station - New Town Shapoorji Housing Estate
- Sarenga (Kolatala More) - New Town Unitech

=== Train ===
Sankrail railway station on Howrah-Kharagpur line is the nearest railway station.
