= Manikpur, West Bengal =

Manikpur
- Census Town
- Location in West Bengal, India Manikpur (India)
- Coordinates: 22.47°N 88.03°E
- Country: India
- State: West Bengal
- District: Howrah

Population (2011)
  - Total: 19,804

Languages
  - Official: Bengali, English
- Time zone: UTC+5:30 (IST)
- ISO 3166 code: IN-WB
- Vehicle registration: WB
- Lok Sabha constituency: Howrah
- Vidhan Sabha constituency: Sankrail
- Website: howrah.gov.in

Manikpur is a census town in Sankrail CD Block of Howrah Sadar subdivision in Howrah district in the Indian state of West Bengal.

== Geography ==
Manikpur is located at 22.47°N 88.03°E.

== Demographics ==
As per 2011 Census of India Manikpur had a total population of 19,804 of which 10,392 (52%) were males and 9,412 (48%) were females. Population below 6 years was 2,253. The total number of literates in Manikpur was 13,378 (76.22% of the population over 6 years).

Manikpur was part of Kolkata Urban Agglomeration in 2011 census.

As of 2001 India census, Manikpur had a population of 19,125. Males constitute 55% of the population and females 45%. Manikpur has an average literacy rate of 61%, higher than the national average of 59.5%: male literacy is 67% and female literacy is 54%. In Manikpur, 12% of the population is under 6 years of age.

== Transport ==
=== Bus ===
- Sarenga (Kolatala More) - New Town Unitech

=== Train ===
Sankrail railway station and Abada railway station on Howrah-Kharagpur line are the nearest railway stations.
