= Hatgachha =

- Census Town
- Location in West Bengal, India Hatgachha (India)
- Coordinates: 22.42°N 88.05°E
- Country: India
- State: West Bengal
- District: Howrah

Population (2011)
  - Total: 5,980

Languages
  - Official: Bengali, English
- Time zone: UTC+5:30 (IST)
- PIN: 711316
- Vehicle registration: WB
- Lok Sabha constituency: Howrah
- Vidhan Sabha constituency: Sankrail
- Website: howrah.gov.in

Hatgachha is a census town in Sankrail CD Block of Howrah Sadar subdivision in Howrah district in the Indian state of West Bengal.

== Geography ==
Hatgachha is located at 22°25′27″N 88°03′08″E.

== Demographics ==
As per 2011 Census of India Hatgachha had a total population of 5,980 of which 3,086 (52%) were males and 2,894 (48%) were females. Population below 6 years was 558. The total number of literates in Hatgachha was 4,842 (89.30% of the population over 6 years).

Hatgachha was part of Kolkata Urban Agglomeration in 2011 census.

As of 2001 India census, Hatgachha had a population of 5560. Males constitute 53% of the population and females 47%. Hatgachha has an average literacy rate of 80%, higher than the national average of 59.5%: male literacy is 84% and female literacy is 75%. In Hatgachha, 9% of the population is under 6 years of age.

== Transport ==
Satyen Bose Road is the artery of the town.

=== Bus ===
==== Private Bus ====
- 69 Sankrail railway station - Howrah Station

==== Mini Bus ====
- 24 Sankrail railway station - Howrah Station

==== Bus Routes Without Numbers ====
- Sankrail railway station - New Town Shapoorji Housing Estate
- Sarenga (Kolatala More) - New Town Unitech

=== Train ===
Andul railway station on Howrah-Kharagpur line is the nearest railway station.
