= Ramchandrapur, West Bengal =

Ramchandrapur
- Census Town
- Location in West Bengal, India Ramchandrapur (India)
- Coordinates: 22.891°N 88.473°E
- Country: India
- State: West Bengal
- District: Howrah

Population (2011)
  - Total: 10,312

Languages
  - Official: Bengali, English
- Time zone: UTC+5:30 (IST)
- ISO 3166 code: IN-WB
- Vehicle registration: WB
- Lok Sabha constituency: Howrah
- Vidhan Sabha constituency: Sankrail
- Website: howrah.gov.in

Ramchandrapur is a census town in Sankrail CD Block of Howrah Sadar subdivision in Howrah district in the Indian state of West Bengal.

== Demographics ==
As per 2011 Census of India Ramchandrapur had a total population of 10,312 of which 5,284 (51%) were males and 5,028 (49%) were females. Population below 6 years was 958. The total number of literates in Ramchandrapur was 8,150 (87.13% of the population over 6 years).

Ramchandrapur was part of Kolkata Urban Agglomeration in 2011 census.

As of 2001 India census, Ramchandrapur had a population of 9,014. Males constitute 52% of the population and females 48%. Ramchandrapur has an average literacy rate of 76%, higher than the national average of 59.5%: male literacy is 80% and female literacy is 71%. In Ramchandrapur, 11% of the population is under 6 years of age.

== Transport ==
Satyen Bose Road (Sankrail Station Road) is the artery of the town.

=== Bus ===
==== Private Bus ====
- 69 Sankrail railway station - Howrah Station

==== Mini Bus ====
- 24 Sankrail railway station - Howrah Station

==== Bus Routes Without Numbers ====
- Sankrail railway station - New Town Shapoorji Housing Estate
- Sarenga (Kolatala More) - New Town Unitech

=== Train ===
Andul railway station and Sankrail railway station on Howrah-Kharagpur line are the nearest railway stations.
