= Panchpara =

- Census Town
- Location in West Bengal, India Panchpara (India)
- Coordinates: 22.567428°N 88.256140°E
- Country: India
- State: West Bengal
- District: Howrah

Population (2011)
  - Total: 19,283

Languages
  - Official: Bengali, English
- Time zone: UTC+5:30 (IST)
- PIN: 711317
- Vehicle registration: WB
- Lok Sabha constituency: Howrah
- Vidhan Sabha constituency: Sankrail
- Website: howrah.gov.in

Panchpara is a census town in Sankrail CD Block of Howrah Sadar subdivision in Howrah district in the Indian state of West Bengal.

== Geography ==
Panchpara is located at 22.567428°N 88.256140°E.

== Demographics ==
As per 2011 Census of India Panchpara had a total population of 19,283 of which 9,976 (52%) were males and 9,307 (48%) were females. Population below 6 years was 2,415. The total number of literates in Panchpara was 14,127 (83.75% of the population over 6 years).

Panchpara was part of Kolkata Urban Agglomeration in 2011 census.

As of 2001 India census, Panchpara had a population of 15,078. Males constitute 52% of the population and females 48%. Panchpara has an average literacy rate of 71%, higher than the national average of 59.5%: male literacy is 74% and female literacy is 67%. In Panchpara, 14% of the population is under 6 years of age.

== Transport ==
Satyen Bose Road is the artery of the town.

=== Bus ===
==== Private Bus ====
- 69 Sankrail railway station - Howrah Station

==== Mini Bus ====
- 24 Sankrail railway station - Howrah Station

==== Bus Routes Without Numbers ====
- Sankrail railway station - New Town Shapoorji Housing Estate
- Sarenga (Kolatala More) - New Town Unitech

=== Train ===
Mourigram railway station on Howrah-Kharagpur line is the nearest railway station.
