= Priya Paul (politician) =

Politician from West Bengal, India

Member of the West Bengal Legislative Assembly
- Incumbent
- Assumed office 2 May 2021
- Preceded by: Sital Kumar Sardar
- Constituency: Sankrail

Personal details
- Born: 1971 (age 54–55) Hirapur, Howrah district, West Bengal
- Party: Democratic Trinamool Congress

Priya Paul (born 1971) is an Indian politician from West Bengal. She is a member of the West Bengal Legislative Assembly from Sankrail Assembly constituency, which is reserved for Scheduled Caste community, in Howrah district. She won the 2021 West Bengal Legislative Assembly election representing the Trinamool Congress.

== Early life and education ==
Paul is from Hirapur village, Sankrail post, Howrah district, West Bengal. She is the wife of Amit Paul. She completed her Master of Arts in geography in 2013 at the Global Open University, Nagaland. She is a teacher.

== Career ==
Paul won from Sankrail Assembly constituency representing All India Trinamool Congress in the 2021 West Bengal Legislative Assembly election. She polled 111,888 votes and defeated her nearest rival, Probhakar Pandit of the Bharatiya Janata Party, by a margin of 40,427 votes.
