= Tentulkuli =

- Census Town
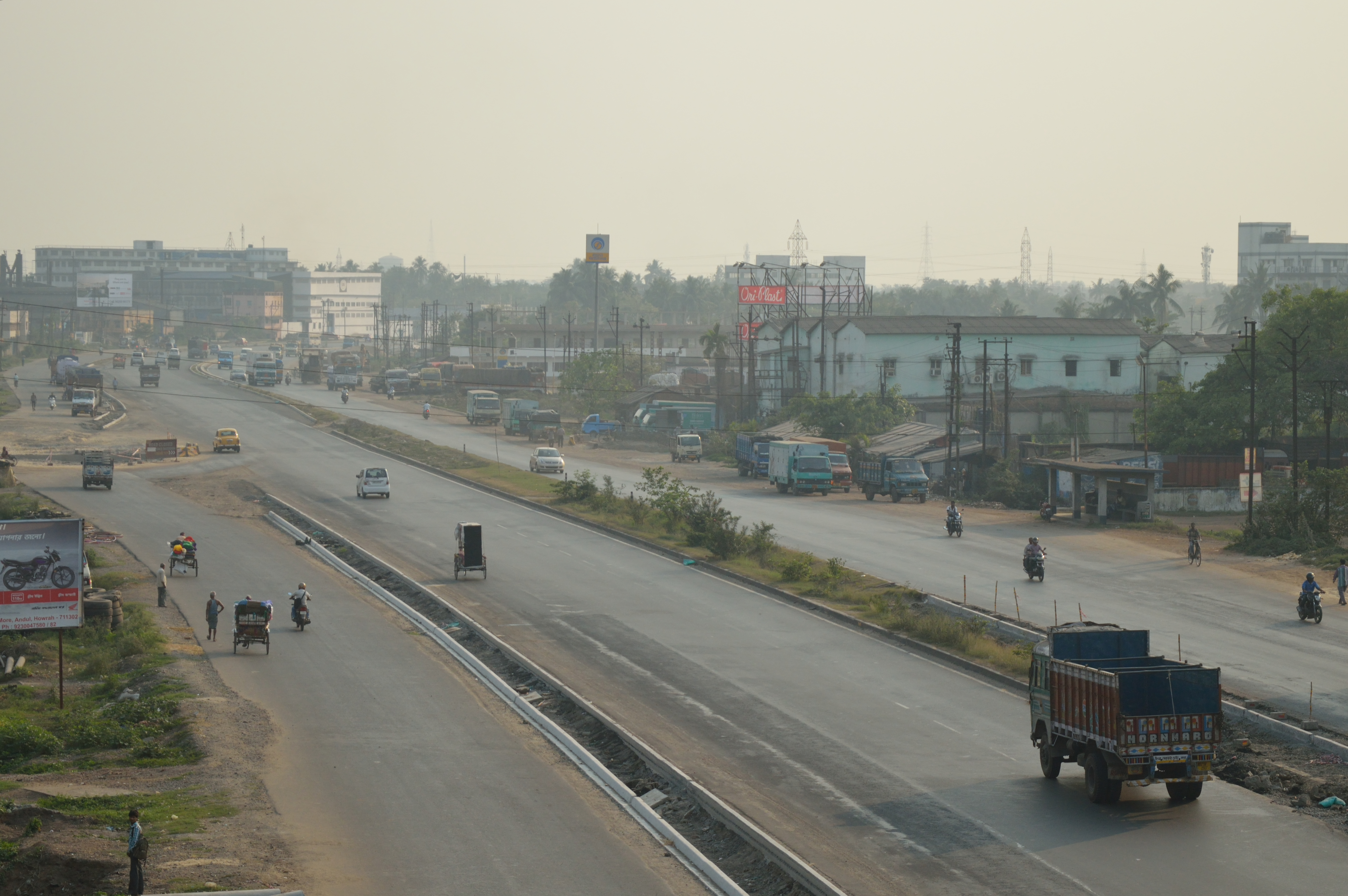
- National Highway 16/ Asian Highway 45, Tentulkuli

- Location in West Bengal, India Tentulkuli (West Bengal) Tentulkuli (India)
- Coordinates: 22.62°N 88.27°E
- Country: India
- State: West Bengal
- District: Howrah

Population (2011)
  - Total: 7,203

Languages
  - Official: Bengali, English
- Time zone: UTC+5:30 (IST)
- Vehicle registration: WB
- Lok Sabha constituency: Sreerampur
- Vidhan Sabha constituency: Domjur
- Website: howrah.gov.in

Tentulkuli is a census town in Domjur CD Block of Howrah Sadar subdivision in Howrah district in the Indian state of West Bengal.

== Geography ==
Tentulkuli is located at 22.62°N 88.27°E between Salap and Pakuria.

== Demographics ==
As per 2011 Census of India Tentulkuli had a total population of 7,203 of which 3,685 (51%) were males and 3,518 (49%) were females. Population below 6 years was 655. The total number of literates in Tentulkuli was 5,746 (87.75% of the population over 6 years).

Tentulkuli was part of Kolkata Urban Agglomeration in 2011 census.

As of 2001 India census, Tentulkuli had a population of 5122. Males constitute 51% of the population and females 49%. Tentulkuli has an average literacy rate of 68%, higher than the national average of 59.5%: male literacy is 74% and female literacy is 62%. In Tentulkuli, 11% of the population is under 6 years of age.

== Transport ==
National Highway 16 (part of Asian Highway 45) passes beside Tentulkuli.

=== Bus ===
==== Private Bus ====
- 40 Birshibpur - Serampore
- 79 Panchla - Dunlop

Many Shuttle Buses (Without Numbers) also pass through Tentulkuli.

=== Train ===
Dansi railway station is the nearest railway station on Howrah-Amta line.
