= Gangadharpur, Howrah =

Gangadharpur
- Census Town
- Location in West Bengal, India Gangadharpur (India)
- Coordinates: 22.586°N 88.159°E
- Country: India
- State: West Bengal
- District: Howrah
- Elevation: 7 m (23 ft)

Population (2011)
  - Total: 7,533

Languages
  - Official: Bengali, English
- Time zone: UTC+5:30 (IST)
- PIN: 711302
- Telephone code: 91 3214
- Vehicle registration: WB
- Lok Sabha constituency: Howrah
- Vidhan Sabha constituency: Panchla
- Website: howrah.gov.in

Gangadharpur is a census town in Panchla CD Block and police station in Sadar subdivision of Howrah district in the Indian state of West Bengal.

== Geography ==
Gangadharpur is located at 22.586°N 88.159°E. It has an average elevation of 7 metres (22 feet).

== Demographics ==
As per 2011 Census of India Gangadharpur had a total population of 7533 of which 3858 (51%) were males and 3675(49%) were females. Population below 6 years was 823. The total number of literates in Gangadharpur was 80.22%.
