= Abada, India =

Abada
- Village
- Location in West Bengal, India Abada (India)
- Coordinates: 22.54781°N 88.19967°E
- State: West Bengal
- District: Howrah

Languages
  - Official: Bengali, English
- Time zone: UTC+5:30 (IST)
- Postal code: 711313
- Nearest city: Howrah, Kolkata
- Website: howrah.gov.in

Abada is a village in Howrah district of West Bengal, India. Its local railway station is Abada railway station.
