= KWIC =

KWIC may refer to:

- Kawartha World Issues Centre, a charitable global education and resource centre, serving Peterborough, Ontario and surrounding communities
- Key Word in Context, a way of presenting search results or concordances with context
- King Wilhelm Institute of Chemistry, German research research facility ca. 1900
- Kolkata West International City, a satellite township development of Kolkata
- KWIC (FM), a radio station (99.3 FM) licensed to Topeka, Kansas, United States
