= Universal Success Enterprises Limited =

Singapore-based company, founded in 1995

- Type: Private
- Industry: Real estate, industrial and logistics parks, data centres, energy and natural resources
- Founded: 1995; 31 years ago
- Founder: Prasoon Mukherje
- Headquarters: Singapore
- Area served: Worldwide
- Key people: Prasoon Mukherje (Chairman); Prashant Mukherjee (Managing Director)

Universal Success Enterprises Limited (USEL) is a Singapore-based company with interests in real estate, industrial and logistics parks, information-technology parks, data centres, and energy and natural resources. It was founded in 1995 by Prasoon Mukherjee, who is its chairman.

Mukherjee is also associated with business organisations in Singapore and serves as Adviser for India and Latin America to the Singapore Manufacturing Federation (SMF), Chairman of the India Business Committee of the Singapore Business Federation (SBF), Vice-Chairman of the SBF International Action Committee, and Vice-Chairman of the SBF ASEAN Committee.

Prasoon Mukherjee on behalf of USEL met Prime Minister of India Shri Narendra Modi to discuss a range of strategic investment opportunities aimed at deepening ASEAN–India economic collaboration.

== History and developments ==
In 1995 the company was founded in Singapore by Prasoon Mukherjee. In 2004, it began real estate development in India with the Kolkata West International City project.

The company became a shareholder in an Indonesian coal-mining venture in 2012. In 2023 USEL announced an investment programme in Uttar Pradesh of ₹8,950 crore, covering an IT city, a logistics park and a hyperscale data centre. The Tech Capital reports a data-centre commitment of about US$240 million in West Bengal.

By 2024 the company planned to invest ₹2,000 crore in West Bengal over six years and in 2025 USEL proposed a logistics park of was signed at the Advantage Assam summit.

In 2026 USE signed an MOU with Govt of UP for an investment proposal of Rs. 6,650 Crore in townships, data centre and logistics park. The company also signed an MoU with the Government of Haryana for a proposed investment of ₹13,000 crore. In 2024, USEL proposed developing a 500 MW solar park in Gujarat as part of its renewable energy investment plans. Company's chairman Prasoon Mukherjee met the West Bengal chief minister and expressed interest in investing in a logistics park in the state.
