= Mohammed Elias =

West Bengal politician

- মোহম্মদ ইলিয়াস

Member of the Parliament, Lok Sabha
- In office 1957–1967
- Constituency: Howrah

Personal details
- Born: Howrah district, Bengal
- Party: Communist Party of India

Mohammed Elias was a West Bengali politician.

== Biography ==
Elias was born in to a Bengali family of Muslim farmers in Howrah district. He was a Communist leader who served as member of the Lok Sabha, the lower house of the Parliament of India for the Howrah constituency for two consecutive terms in 1957 to 1962 and 1962 to 1967. He was general secretary and president of West Bengal Trade Union Congress for several years and at one point the vice-president of All India Trade Union Congress. He died in 1990.
