= Sital Kumar Sardar =

Indian politician (1942–2025)

Sital Kumar Sardar (1942 – 12 November 2025) was an Indian politician from West Bengal. He was a five time consecutive member of the West Bengal Legislative Assembly from Sankrail Assembly constituency, which is reserved for Scheduled Caste community, in Howrah district. He first won the 1996 West Bengal Legislative Assembly election representing the Indian National Congress and went on to win four more times till 2016 on All India Trinamool Congress ticket.

== Background ==
Sardar was born in 1942, and came from Sankrail, Howrah district, West Bengal. He was the son of late Khandu Charan Sardar. Sardar studied Class 12 at Shibpur Dinabandhu Institution, in the then Calcutta in 1961. Prior to this, he was schooled at New Andul High School and passed the board examinations in 1959.

Sardar died on 12 November 2025, at the age of 83.

== Career ==
Sardar first became an MLA from Sankrail Assembly constituency representing the Indian National Congress, winning the 1996 West Bengal Legislative Assembly election. Then he shifted to the All India Trinamool Congress and won the seat for another consecutive four terms. He won in 2001, 2006, 2011 and 2016 on Trinamool Congress ticket. In the 2016 West Bengal Legislative Assembly election, he polled 86,212 votes and defeated his nearest rival, Samir Malick of the Communist Party of India (Marxist), by a margin of 14,757 votes. In 2011, he polled 88,029 votes and defeated his closest rival, Anirban Hazra, also from the Communist Party of India (Marxist), by a margin of 17,857 votes.
