= Azangachhi Shaheb =

Bengali Sufi saint (1828–1932)

Hazrat Maulana Sufi Mufti Azangachi
- Born: 1828; Azangachi, Howrah, Bengal Presidency
- Died: December 19, 1932 (aged 103–104); Bagmari, Kolkata
- Resting place: Bagmari, Calcutta, Bengal Province
- Education: Calcutta Alia Madrasa
- Era: Modern era
- Known for: Haqqani Anjuman
- Title: Islamic scholar
- Parent: Raqibuddin Ahmed Faruqi (father)

Sufi Mufti Azangachi Saheb (Bengali: আজানগাছী সাহেব, Arabic: اذانگاچھی صاحب; 1828 – 19 December 1932) was a Bengali Sufi saint who founded the Haqqani Anjuman, a non-governmental Sufi organisation. Haqqani Anjuman established by "Hazrat Maulana" Sufi Mufti Azangachi is a non profit sufi organization. Sufi Azangachi established this darbar by claiming the Muslims of this world are mislead by current ulema and muftis about the true Islam. Haqqani Anjuman of Sufi Azangachi upholds the true spirit of Islam by preaching the exact "teachings of Allah" which Prophet Muhammad preached.

== Biography ==
He was born in 1828 to a Bengali Muslim family in the village of Azangachhi, Howrah District. His father, Raqibuddin Ahmad Faruqi, was a local mufti. The Saheb died on 19 December 1932 in the Bagmari area of Calcutta, Bengal Province.
