= Sankrail =

- Census Town
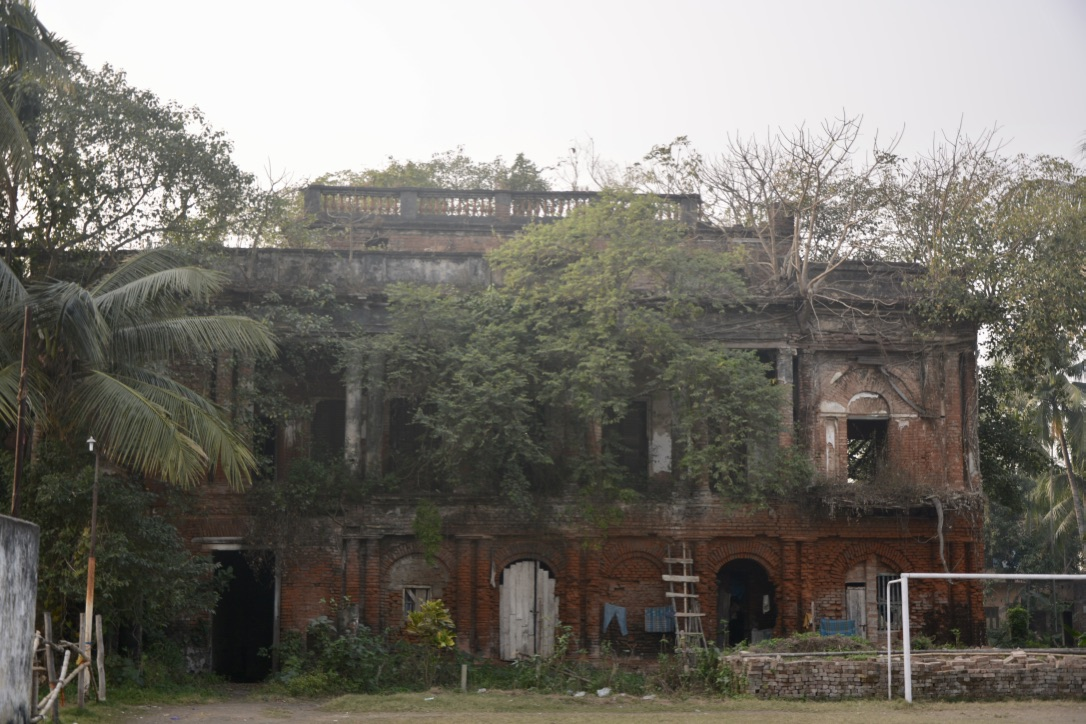
- Sankrail Jamidarbari

- Location in West Bengal, India Sankrail (India)
- Coordinates: 22°33′30″N 88°13′40″E
- Country: India
- State: West Bengal
- District: Howrah
- Elevation: 2 m (6.6 ft)

Population (2011)
  - Total: 29,114

Languages
  - Official: Bengali, English
- Time zone: UTC+5:30 (IST)
- Vehicle registration: WB
- Lok Sabha constituency: Howrah
- Vidhan Sabha constituency: Sankrail
- Website: howrah.gov.in

Confluence of River Saraswati and River Hooghly at Sankrail, Howrah

Sankrail is a census town in Sankrail CD Block of Howrah Sadar subdivision in Howrah district in the Indian state of West Bengal.

== Geography ==
Sankrail is located at 22.57°N 88.24°E. It has an average elevation of 2 metres (6 feet).

== Demographics ==
As per 2011 Census of India Sankrail had a total population of 29,114 of which 14,919 (51%) were males and 14,195 (49%) were females. Population below 6 years was 3,328. The total number of literates in Sankrail was 21,192 (82.18% of the population over 6 years).

Sankrail was part of Kolkata Urban Agglomeration in 2011 census.

As of 2001 India census, Sankrail had a population of 25,590. Males constitute 54% of the population and females 46%. Sankrail has an average literacy rate of 64%, higher than the national average of 59.5%: male literacy is 69% and female literacy is 59%. In Sankrail, 12% of the population is under 6 years of age.

== Transport ==
Munsirhat-Sankrail Road (Sankrail Station Road) is the artery of the town.

=== Bus ===
==== Private Bus ====
- 69 Sankrail railway station - Howrah Station
- 77 Sankrail railway station - Amta

==== Mini Bus ====
- 24 Sankrail railway station - Howrah Station

==== Bus Routes Without Numbers ====
- Sankrail railway station - New Town Shapoorji Housing Estate
- Sankrail railway station - Sealdah Station (Barafkal)

=== Train ===
Sankrail railway station on Howrah-Kharagpur line serves the locality.

== Gallery ==
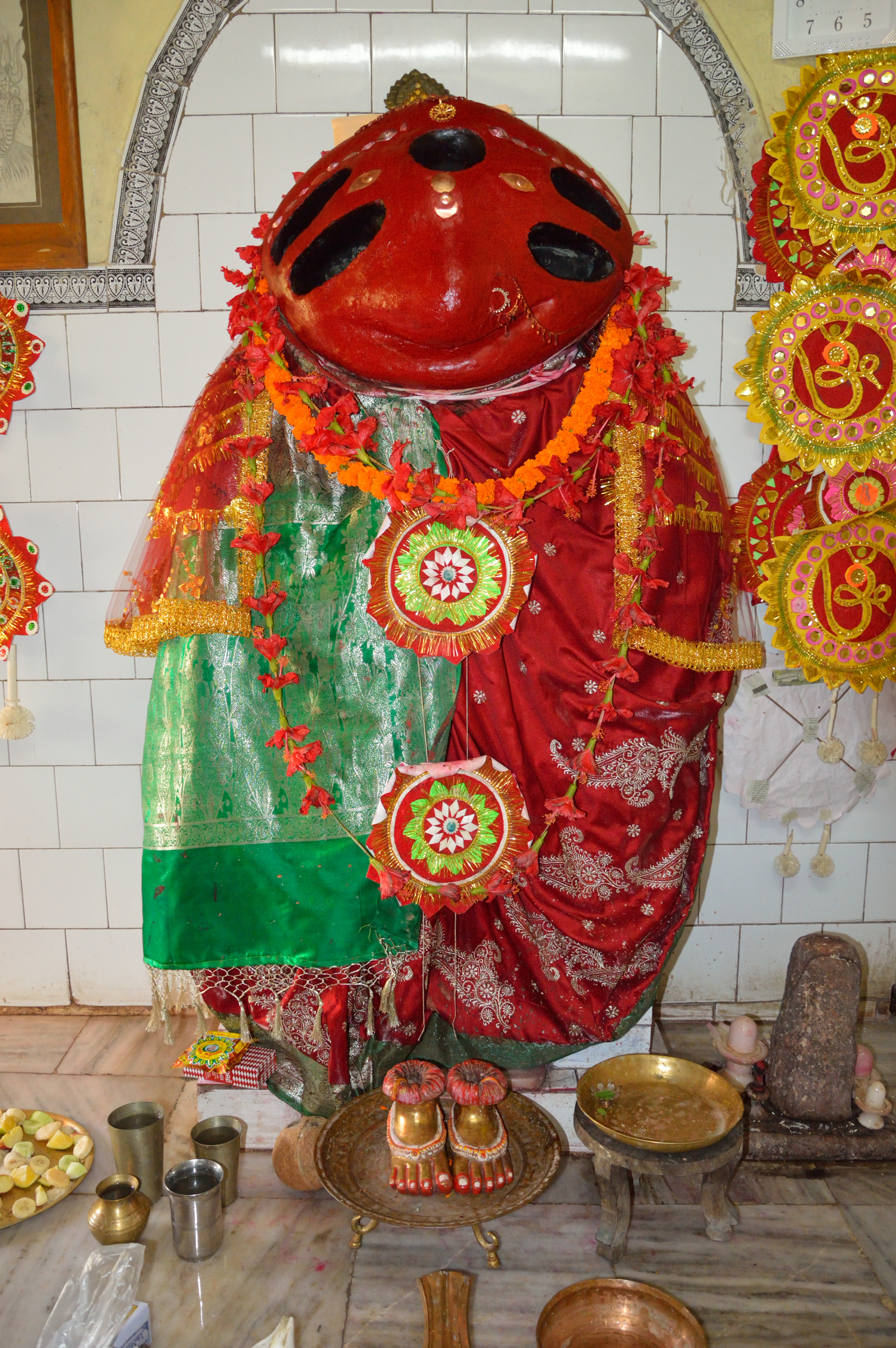
Bishalakhi Mandir, Sankrail

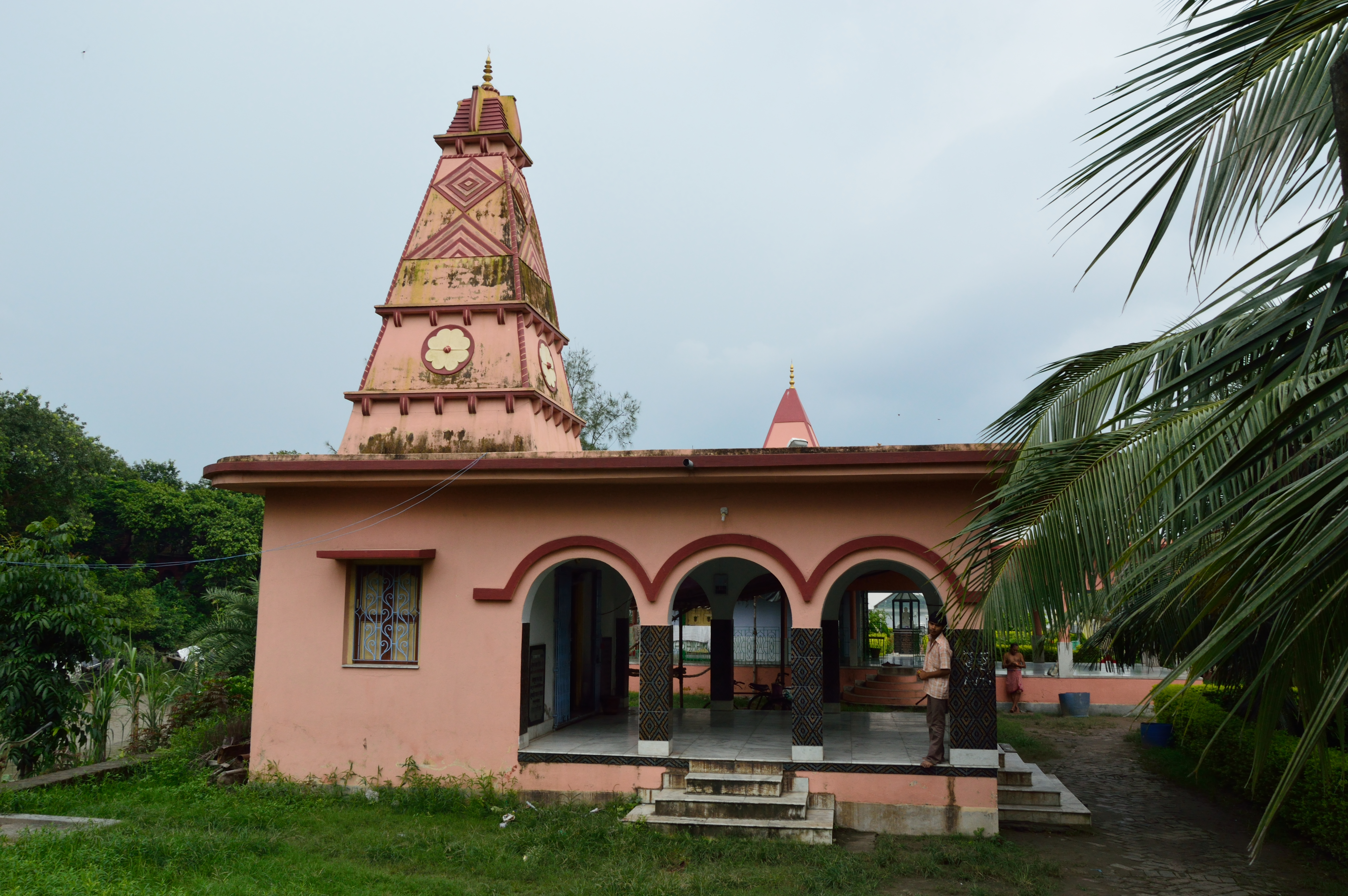
Shani Mandir (Jadu Nath Hati Smasana Complex), Sankrail

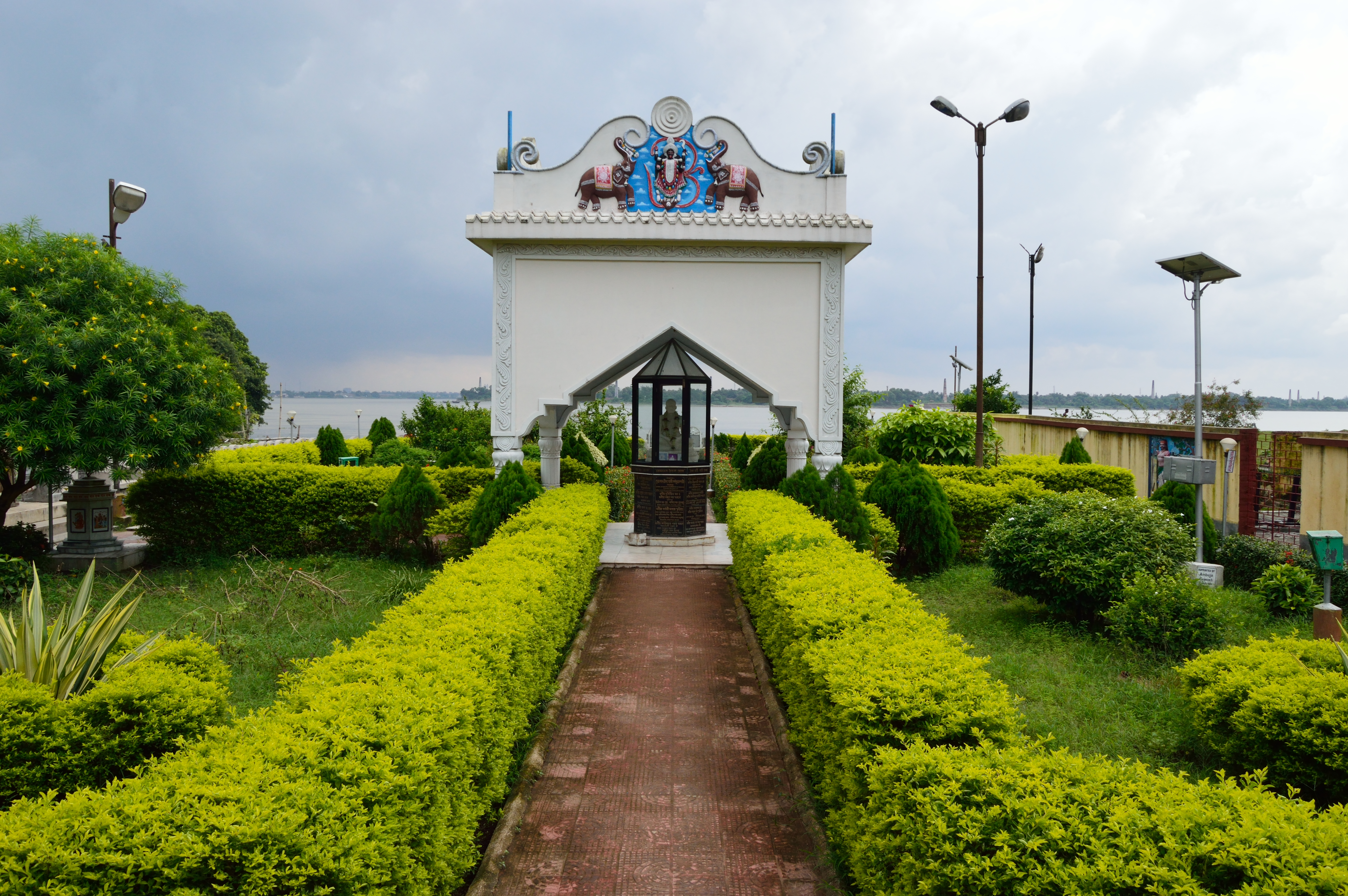
Ramakrishna Mandir (Jadu Nath Hati Smasana Complex), Sankrail
