= Dansi railway station =

Railway station in West Bengal

Dansi
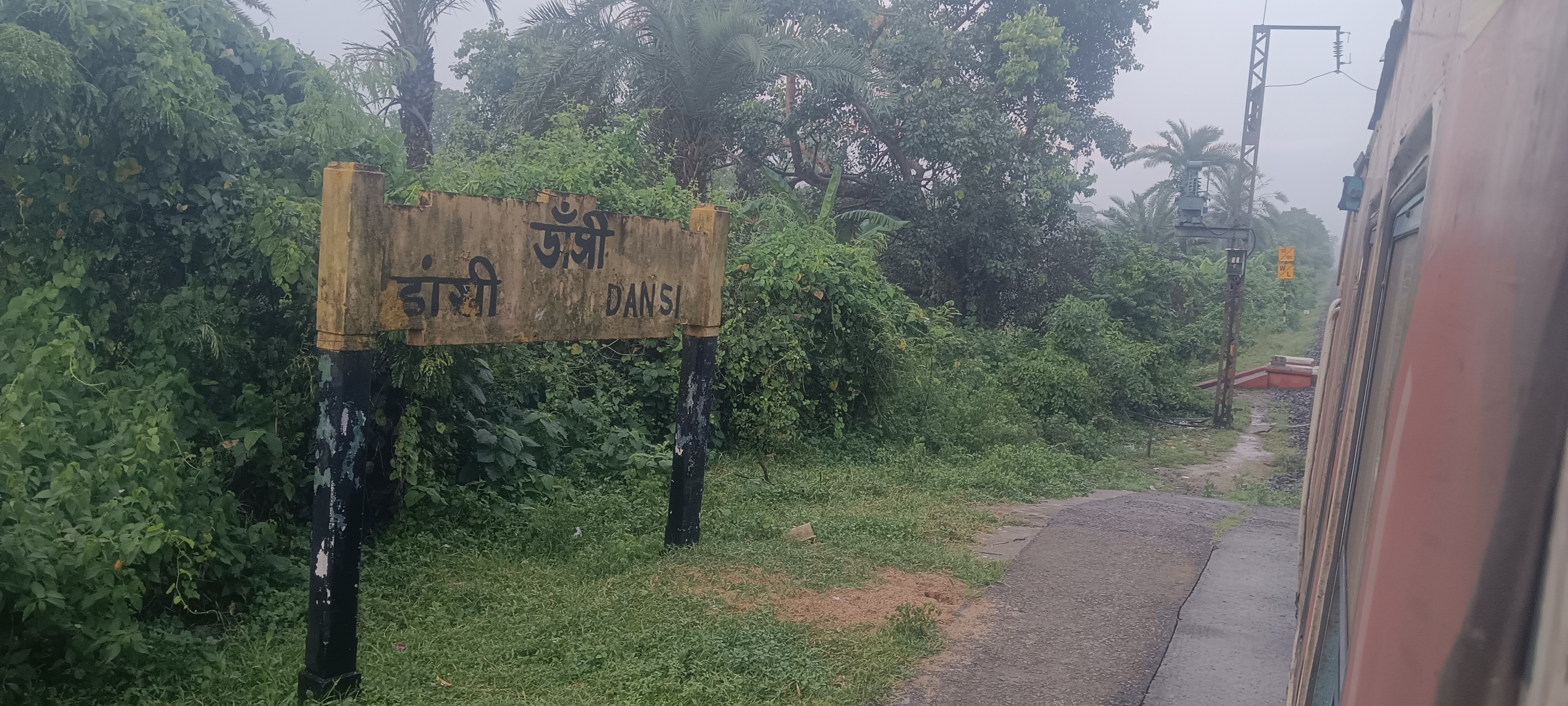
- Dansi Railway Station

General information
- Location: Katlia–Nibra NH-6 Connector Road, Dansi, Salap, Howrah district, West Bengal; India
- Coordinates: 22°37′20″N 88°15′58″E
- Elevation: 4 metres (13 ft)
- System: Suburban rail station
- Owner: Indian Railways
- Operator: South Eastern Railway zone
- Line: Santragachi–Amta branch line
- Platforms: 1
- Tracks: 1

Construction
- Structure type: Standard (on-ground station)

Other information
- Status: Functioning
- Station code: DNI
- Zone(s): South Eastern Railway zone
- Division(s): Kharagpur

History
- Opened: 1897
- Closed: 1971
- Rebuilt: 2004
- Former names: Howrah–Amta Light Railway

Services
Preceding station	Kolkata Suburban Railway	Following station
Jhaluarbar towards Amta	South Eastern Line Santragachi–Amta branch line	Kona towards Howrah Junction
Route map
- Source: Google Maps
Location
- Location within Kolkata Location within West Bengal Location within India

Dansi railway station is a railway station on Santragachi–Amta branch line of South Eastern Railway section of the Kharagpur railway division. It is situated beside Katlia-Nibra National Highway 6 Connector Road at Dansi, Salap in Howrah district in the Indian state of West Bengal.

== History ==
Howrah to Amta narrow-gauge track was built in 1897 in British India. This route was the part of the Martin's Light Railways which was closed in 1971. Howrah–Amta new broad-gauge line, including the Bargachia–Champadanga branch line was re constructed and opened in 2002–2004.
