= Srideep Bhattacharya =

Indian politician

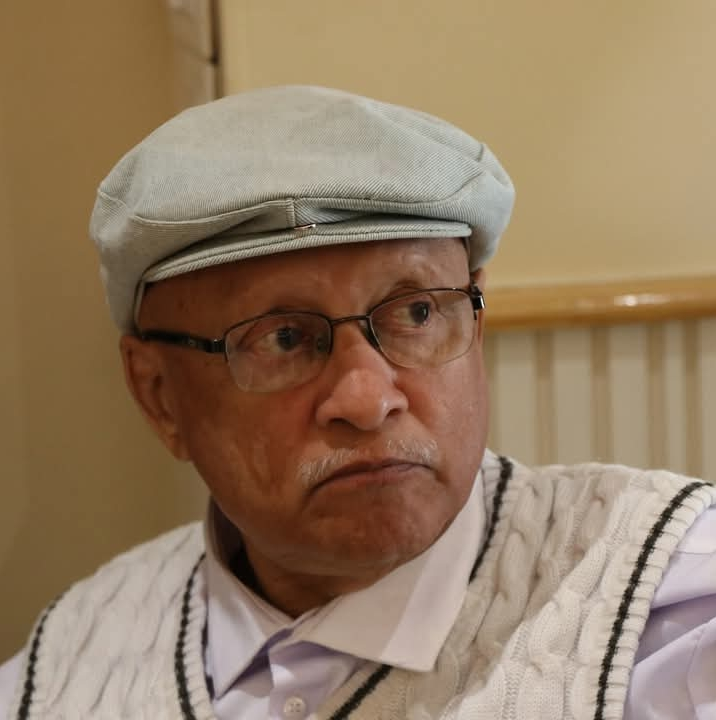

Member of Polit Bureau, Communist Party of India (Marxist)
- Incumbent
- Assumed office 6 April 2025

Member of Central Committee, Communist Party of India (Marxist)
- Incumbent
- Assumed office 19 April 2015

Personal details
- Born: Howrah, West Bengal
- Party: Communist Party of India (Marxist)
- Spouse: Swapna Bhattacharya
- Education: Bengal Engineering College, Shibpur
- Occupation: Politician

Srideep Bhattacharya is an Indian politician affiliated with the Communist Party of India (Marxist). Known for his organizational capabilities and ideological commitment, he has held several key positions within the party, including District Secretary of Howrah, State Secretariat member, Central Committee member and member of Polit Bureau.

== Early life and education ==
Srideep Bhattacharya graduated from Shibpur B.E. College (now IIEST Shibpur), where he studied engineering. During his student years, he became actively involved with the Students Federation of India (SFI), the student wing of CPI(M). He rose through the ranks to become a member of the SFI state committee.

Bhattacharya was also involved in the people's science movement in West Bengal and was secretary of Paschim Banga Vigyan Mancha which is considered to be the largest people science organization in India.

== Political career ==
Bhattacharya began his full-time political career with the CPI(M) and gained recognition as a capable organizer. He served as the District Committee Secretary of Howrah, a key organizational position within the party.

In 2013, he was nominated by the Left Front as its candidate for the Howrah Lok Sabha by-election. Although he narrowly lost to Prasun Banerjee of Trinamool Congress, the move demonstrated the party's growing confidence in his leadership abilities. He was then one of the members of State Secretariat of West Bengal unit of CPIM. He was again nominated for 2014 Indian general election from the same consistency and he again finished in the second place.

On 19 April 2015 during 21st Party Congress of CPIM, he was elected to the Central Committee of the party for the first time. He was reelected to the Central Committee for the next three Party Congresses too.

In March 2022, Bhattacharya was considered one of the front-runners to succeed Surjya Kanta Mishra as the West Bengal State Secretary of CPI(M). Although he was reportedly favoured by Left Front chairman Biman Bose and was initially ahead in the race, Mohammed Salim was elected ahead of him due to Salim having more experience and popularity.

Reports indicated that his simplicity, ideological clarity, and deep connection with the grassroots cadre contributed to his growing influence within the party.

In February 2025, Bhattacharya was involved in a notable incident during the North 24 Parganas district conference of the CPI(M). Despite opposition from the state leadership, including Bhattacharya and fellow leader Sujan Chakraborty, delegates voted to remove the incumbent district secretary Mrinal Chakraborty. The move highlighted internal democratic functioning within the party and also suggested challenges in reconciling state-level guidance with district-level sentiment.

Srideep was inducted into the Politburo on 6 April during the last day of 24th Party Congress held in Madurai in Tamil Nadu. This move was widely speculated by the news media even before the Party Congress.

== Personal life ==
Bhattacharya is known for his simple lifestyle and dedication to leftist ideology. His wife, Swapna Bhattacharya, is also politically active and has previously served as the Chairperson of the Howrah Municipal Corporation.

== Electoral performance ==
=== 2013 ===
Bye-elections to the Lok Sabha - 2013 : Howrah
Party	Candidate	Votes	%	±%
AITC	Prasun Banerjee	4,26,387	44.68	
CPI(M)	Srideep Bhattacharya	3,99,422	41.85	
INC	Sanatan Mukherjee	96,743	10.14	
IND	Ranjan Paul	8,921	0.93	
Majority		26,965	2.82	
Turnout		9,54,850	65.99	

=== 2014 ===
2014 Indian general elections: Howrah
Party	Candidate	Votes	%	±%
AITC	Prasun Banerjee	488,461	43.40	
CPI(M)	Srideep Bhattacharya	2,91,505	25.90	
BJP	George Baker	2,48,120	22.05	
INC	Manoj Kumar Pandey	63,254	5.62	
NOTA	None of the above	9,929	0.88	
Majority		1,96,956	17.50	
Turnout		11,25,728	74.79	
