= 2016 Dhulagarh riots =

Ethnic riots in West Bengal, India

On 13 and 14 December 2016, rioters attacked and looted shops and houses of the local and set them on fire in Dhulagarh in Howrah district of West Bengal, India following an altercation on 12 December 2016 between processionists and local residents who were observing religious rituals.

== Background ==
Dhulagarh is a small industrial and business hub in Howrah District. It is only 20 km from Nabanna, the seat of state government in the city of Howrah and only 28 km from Kolkata. Dhulagarh falls under Panchla block In the second decade of 21st century the occurrences of communal violence have sharply increased in West Bengal. In 2013 there were 106 instances of communal violence in West Bengal compared to the previous years which had an average of 15-20 each year.

== Attacks ==
On 12 December, Hindus and Muslims clashed when the Mawlid possessions were not allowed to carry out. Both groups hurled bombs at each other. On 13 December, clashes between two communities (Muslims and Hindu) erupted following religious celebrations of Milad-ul-Nabi in Dhulagarh. The mob hurled bombs at local residents. Many people were injured and rendered homeless in the clashes. 65 people were arrested in connection to the riots.

Local residents claimed that they had to flee with their children and elderly as soon as the mob hurled country-made bombs at their houses. Later, the mob allegedly looted the houses and fled with the money and jewelry, later, setting it on fire. They alleged the local police remained inactive and arrived late at some places while the mobs resorted to loot and arson and had told some of them to quickly leave their homes.

== Aftermath ==
The state police claimed that the violence was the outcome of a dispute arising out of a local issue. it stated that 58 arrests were made rin relation to it and the situation was under control. According to a senior state government official, strict actions have been taken on those involved in the violence. Keshari Nath Tripathi, the Governor of Bengal has asked Surajit Kar Purkayastha, the DGP of the state to prepare a report on the incident.

Several local residents talked to India Today and narrated the events of the riots. While the police claimed the situation was under control, the residents contradicted it saying they were still worried and scared about the situation. Zee News which was among the first one to report on the riots had an FIR lodged against its journalists namely editor Sudhir Chaudhary, West Bengal correspondent Pooja Mehta and cameraperson Tanmay Mukherjee though the Sankrail police station didn't confirm any FIR while the New Indian Express presented a copy available to it.

A week after the incident, the state government transferred Sabyasachi Raman Mishra, the Superintendent of Police, Howrah (Rural) for allegedly failing to contain the communal riots. The state government banned the entry of the opposition political parties and the media into the troubled area. The delegations of Congress, BJP and CPI(M) were stopped by the police from entering Dhulagarh.

The state government had started compensating each family with INR 35,000, whose houses were destroyed in the communal riots. The victims stated that the compensation was simply not enough as the losses were much more. More than two weeks after the communal riots, the victims remained homeless as they were wary of returning to their homes in Dhulagarh.

A Public Interest Litigation was filed in the Calcutta High Court, demanding a judicial inquiry into the riot. The first hearing of this case was conducted on 20 January 2017 with the petitioners' lawyer claiming that the police had not taken any action even though a large-scale had taken place. On the other hand, West Bengal government's pleader and advocate pleaded that 14 separate cases had been lodged in relation to the incident and the police has arrested a few culprits. After hearing the arguments from both sides, the division bench instructed the state government to submit an affidavit, stating what measures had been taken by it in relation to the riot.

== Reactions ==
Siddharth Nath Singh of BJP accused the minority cell of Trinamool Congress of actively engineering the riots. The West Bengal unit of the BJP announced that it will move the National Human Rights Commission over the issue of communal riots in Dhulagarh. The BJP claimed attackers were brought in from outside to create trouble in the presence of Trinamool Congress MLA Gulshan Mullick. BJP leader and Rajya Sabha M.P. Roopa Ganguly had alleged that Gulshan Mullick was present when the violence was taking place. Roopa Ganguly said that attackers had also come from Metiabruz and other places.

Mamata Banerjee, the Chief Minister of West Bengal, denied any incident of communal riots in Dhulagarh. She termed the events as a 'small incident' and a 'local problem' and categorically denied any communal problem. She alleged that wrong information was being spread in the social media. Mamata Banerjee has also been accused of destroying 'the secular fabric of West Bengal' as an aftermath of the Dhulagarh Riots and a series of similar incidents during her tenure as the Chief Minister.

== See also ==
- 2016 Kaliachak riots
