= Kolkata West International City =

- Urban, planned Township
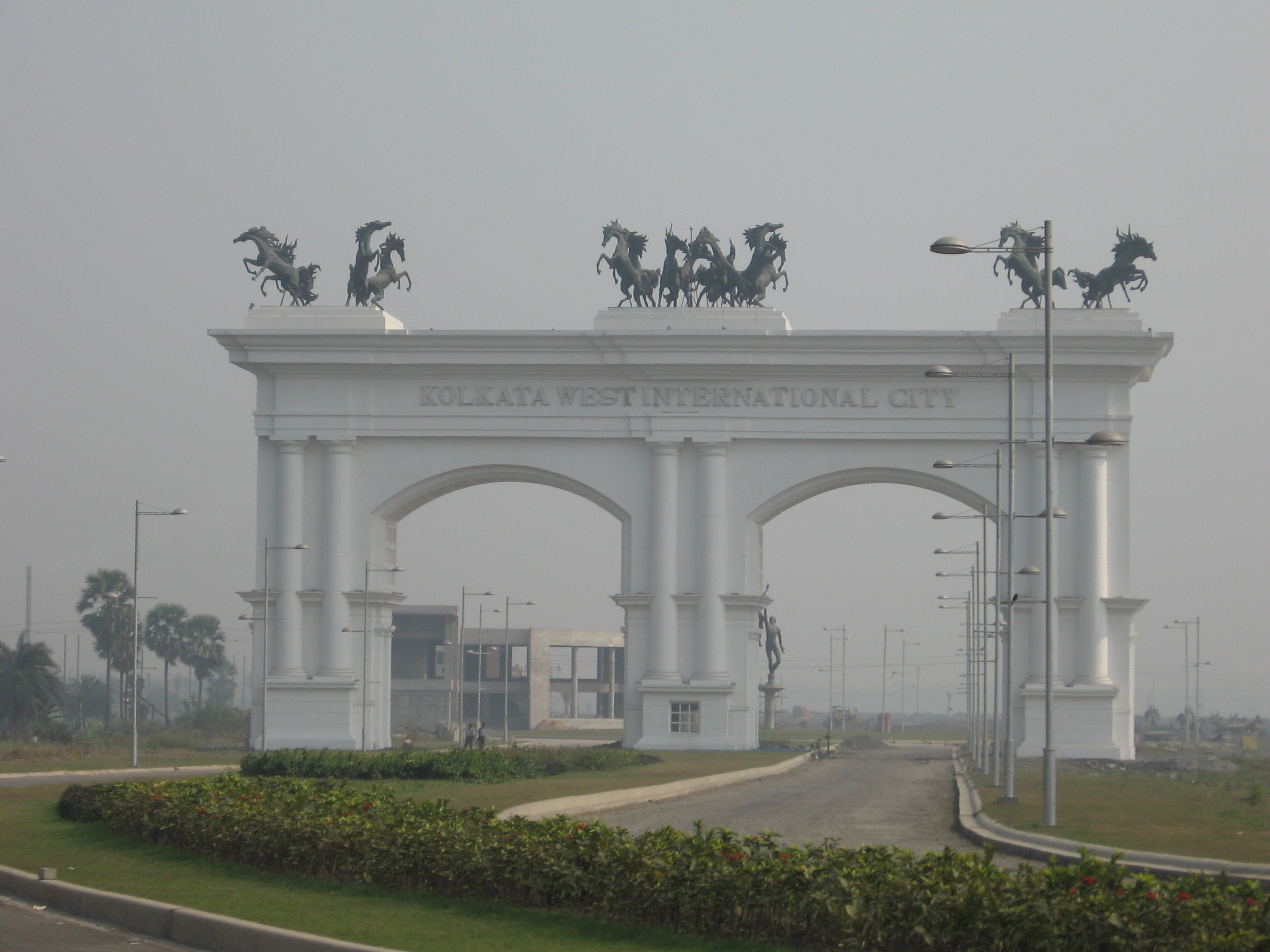
- Kolkata West International gateway

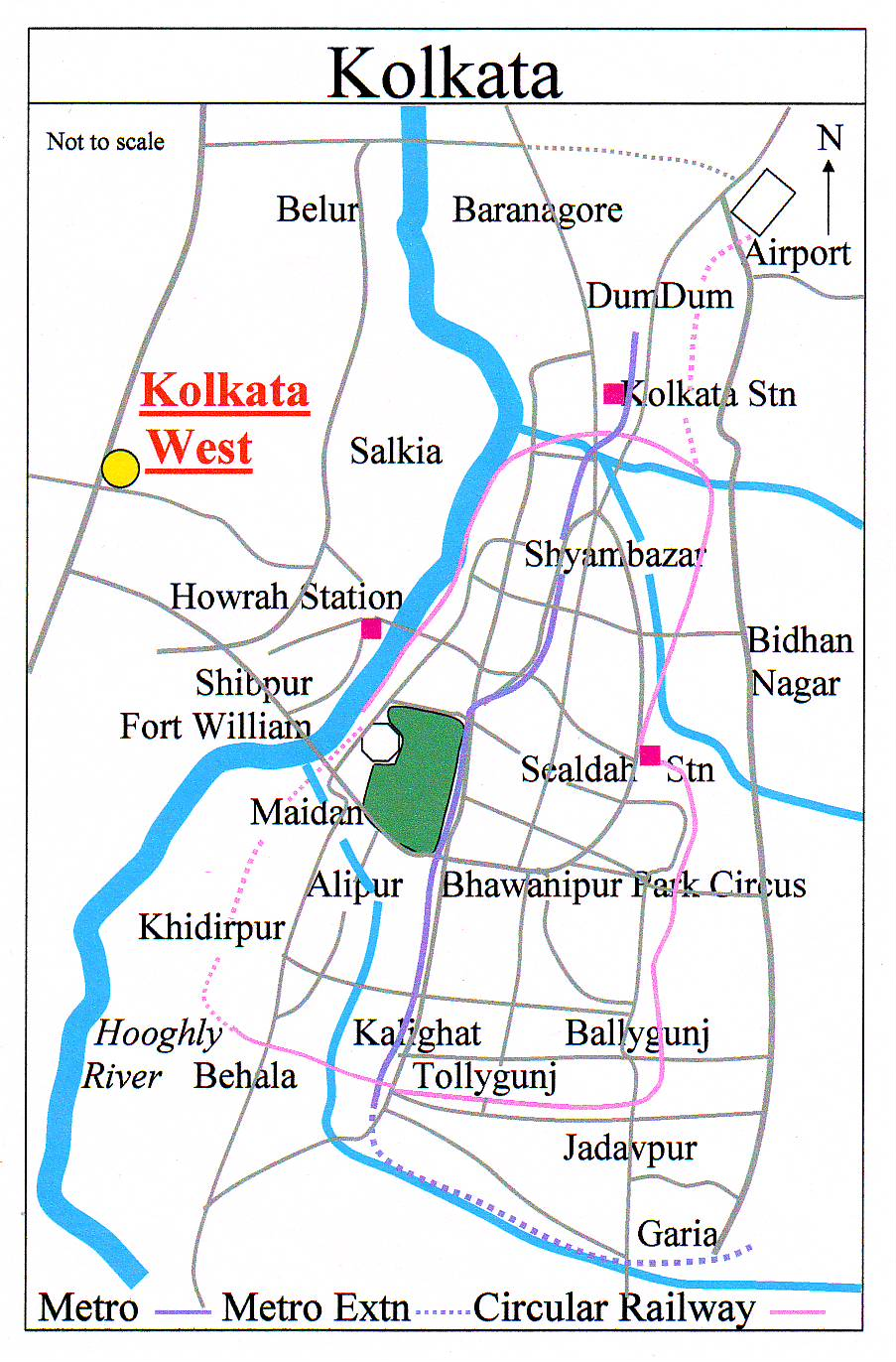
- Salap, Howrah

Area
  - Total: 153 ha (380 acres)

Population
  - Total: 30,000 (approx.)
  - Density: 20,000/km^{2} (51,000/sq mi)
- Website: https://kolkatawest.in/

Kolkata West International City is a satellite township development of Kolkata, located at Salap in Howrah district. The project is under construction in the form of a joint-venture between KMDA and Singapore-based conglomerate Universal Success Group (USEL) headed by Prasoon Mukherjee.

== Project ==
Kolkata West International City (KWIC) is India's first Foreign Direct Investment in real estate and township development. It is a satellite township development of Kolkata, located at Salap in Howrah district. The project is a joint venture between KMDA and USEL. The project is a 372-acre mixed-use development with residential, commercial, institutional and recreational segments. Overall developable area of 41 million square feet and developments currently spread over 6 million sq ft in the township.

The project was one of the largest foreign direct investments in township projects in India and the first in West Bengal. The Kolkata Metropolitan Development Authority acquired a 390-acre plot beside the Kona Expressway at Salap and handed it over to the consortium along with sub-leasing rights. It was unveiled by Buddhadeb Bhattacharya, the then Chief Minister of West Bengal, on 15 February 2006 and was expected to comprise about 11,000 apartments (flats/villas) to house nearly 36,000 people.

The first phase of the project was to span across 82 acres with the flats being priced between Rs 20 lakh and Rs 80 lakh. There were further plans to set up dedicated power stations, sports facilities, IT parks, entertainment zones, hospitals and schools. The first 450 units were to be sold over by December 2007 and the entire project, comprising five phases, was expected to be completed and delivered by 2010.

== Connectivity ==
=== Rail ===
- Santragachi Railway Station – 5 km,
- Bally Railway Station – 15 km,
- Howrah Station– 10 km,
- Shalimar Station – 13 km

=== Metro ===
- Dakshineshwar Metro – 16 km
- Upcoming East West Metro till Santragachi (Presently up to Howrah Maidan)

=== Air ===
- Kolkata Airport – 26 km

=== By road ===
- New Town – 32 km,
- Esplanade – 17 km,
- Sector V – 29 km,
- Dakshineshwar – 17 km

== Existing neighbourhood ==
=== Educational institutions ===
- Podar International School – within campus
- Narayana International School (upcoming) – within campus
- Orchid International School (upcoming) – within campus
- Julien Day School – 0.8 km
- DPS (Domjur) – 5 km
- Asian International School – 15 km
- St. Mary's Day School – 5 km
- Indian Institute of Engineering Science & Technology, Shibpur, Howrah – 10 km
- Tech Skill Academy - 5 km

=== Business centres ===
- Howrah Court – 10 km
- Howrah Maidan – 8 km
- Nabanna -10.5 km
- Park Street – 17 km
- Howrah Collectorate Office – 10 km

=== Entertainment zones ===
- Avani Riverside Mall Howrah – 11 km
- Forum Mall, Elgin Road – 19 km
- Liluah Big Bazar – 10 km
- Rangoli Mall – 16 km
- Quest Mall – 20 km
- South City – 25 km
- City Center II – 30 km

=== Healthcare facilities ===
- Bankra Central Nursing Home – 0.1 km
- Howrah State General Hospital – 10 km
- Narayana Specialty Hospital – 13 km
- ILS Hospitals – 15 km

== Opposition ==
Residents of Howrah, including the former deputy mayor of the Howrah Municipal Corporation, initially demanded that the word "Kolkata" be replaced with "Howrah" in the township's name. They alleged that it would mislead potential land owners into thinking that KWIC was in Kolkata, when it was actually in Howrah.

The project also faced criticism over its water supply. Howrah Municipal Corporation agreed to supply 2 million gallons of water per day to the project, despite its inability to sustain a proper water supply to all of its constituents.

== Delays ==
The developers have missed numerous deadlines since 2008. Less than half of the first phase work was completed by 2013, when it should have been completed by 2008. Salim Group and Ciputra Development went away soon after missing the first deadline.

The buyers have since formed an association (Kolkata West Buyers' Welfare Association) to protest against the delays. A few flats were eventually provided with completion certificates from 2011 and onwards but were allegedly far from complete and constructed in a sub-optimal fashion.

Multiple protests have been held since 2011. In July 2011, Abhay Mohan Jha of HIMAL Southasian, made a visit to the proposed township and found it to be a desolated and uninhabited place, that resembled a cemetery. After being prohibited from entering the property, he visited the project-office in Chowringhee to find about 200 investors in a dharna, who despite having paid in full, were unable to move in, due to lack of any infrastructure. Work progressed at a very slow pace and whilst more houses were eventually constructed, some of them were lacking connecting roads. The Association also protested by writing to West Bengal Chief Minister, Mamata Banerjee.

Universal Success Group blamed the delayed processing of certain approvals from various regulatory bodies such as KMDA. KMDA denied the allegations and claimed the group was not transparent when they queried it about the reasons behind such extraordinary delays.

The Association has also filed a case against Kolkata West with the Competition Commission of India. Some homeowners also filed individual lawsuits demanding a refund.
