= Haqqani Anjuman =

Islamic non-governmental organisation in Bangladesh

- Founded: 1876
- Founder: Maulana Sufi Mufti Azangachhi Shaheb
- Founded at: British India
- Type: Islamic Sufi non-governmental organisation
- Purpose: To serve mankind and give them advice
- Location: Bagmari, Kolkata, West Bengal, India
- Coordinates: 22°35′02″N 88°23′02″E
- Region served: Bangladesh and India

Haqqani Anjuman (Hindi: हक़्क़ानी अंजुमन; Bengali: হাক্কানী আঞ্জুমান; Urdu: حقانی انجمن; Tamil: ஹக்கானி அஞ்சுமான்; Telugu: హక్కాని అంజుమన్; Gujarati: હક્કાની અંજુમન; Russian: Хаккани Анджуман; Chinese: 哈卡尼安朱曼; Kannada: ಹಕ್ಕಾನಿ ಅಂಜುಮನ್; Malayalam: ഹഖാനി അൻജുമൻ) is an Islamic Sufi non-governmental organisation that serves the regions of Bangladesh and India. The organisation was established in 1876 by Azangachhi Shaheb, and has its head office in Bagmari, Kolkata, in the state of West Bengal, India.

The organisation is influenced by Sufism and is associated with social work. The literal meaning of Haqqani Anjuman is the organization of truth.

== See also ==
- Sufism in Bangladesh
- Sufism in India
- Spiritual practice
