= Salap =

- Census Town
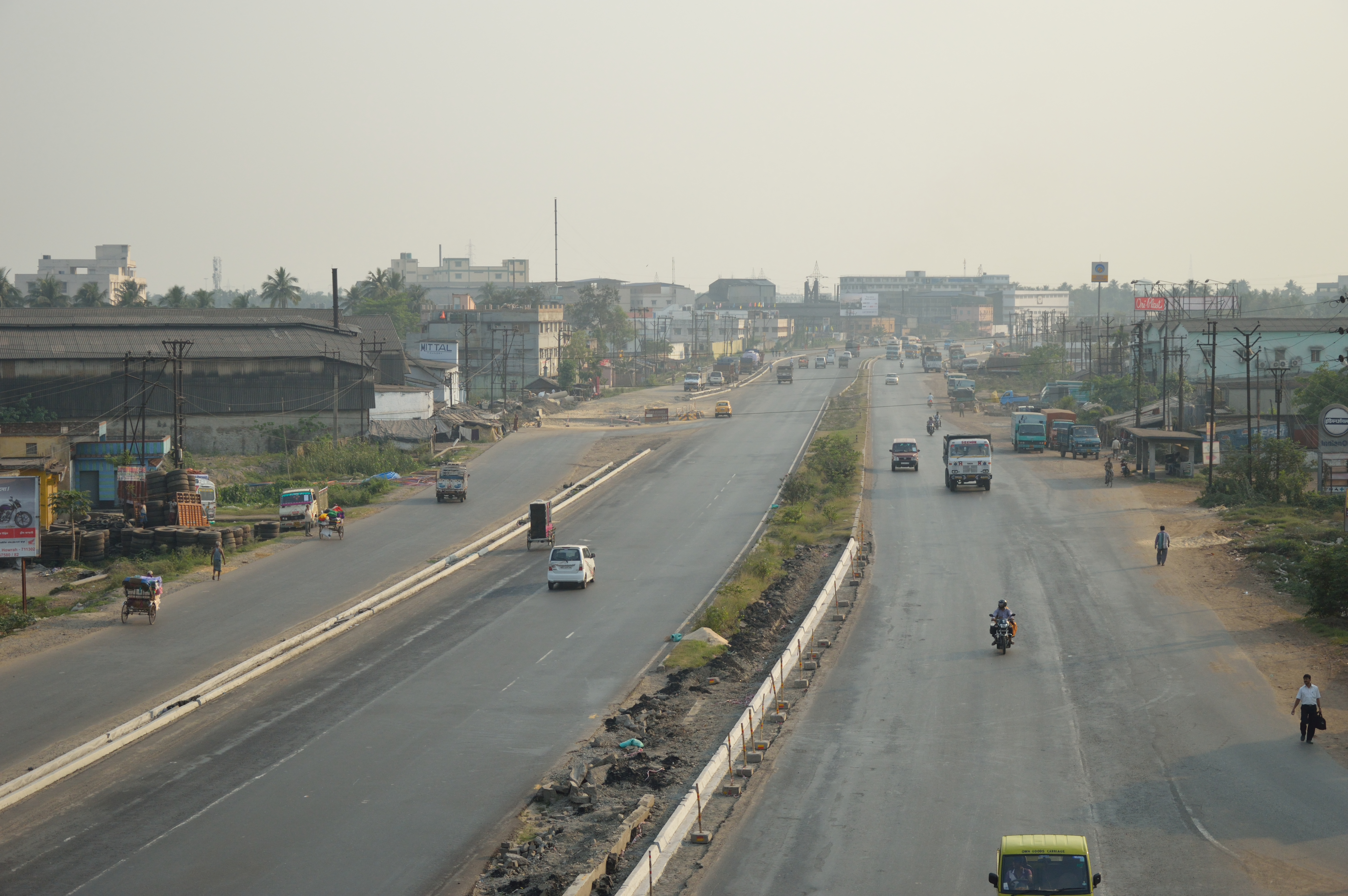
- National Highway 16/ Asian Highway 45, Salap

- Location in West Bengal, India Salap (West Bengal) Salap (India)
- Coordinates: 22.61°N 88.27°E
- Country: India
- State: West Bengal
- District: Howrah

Population (2011)
  - Total: 15,171

Languages
  - Official: Bengali, English
- Time zone: UTC+5:30 (IST)
- Vehicle registration: WB
- Lok Sabha constituency: Sreerampur
- Vidhan Sabha constituency: Domjur
- Website: howrah.gov.in

Salap is a census town in Domjur CD Block of Howrah Sadar subdivision in Howrah district in the Indian state of West Bengal.

== Geography ==
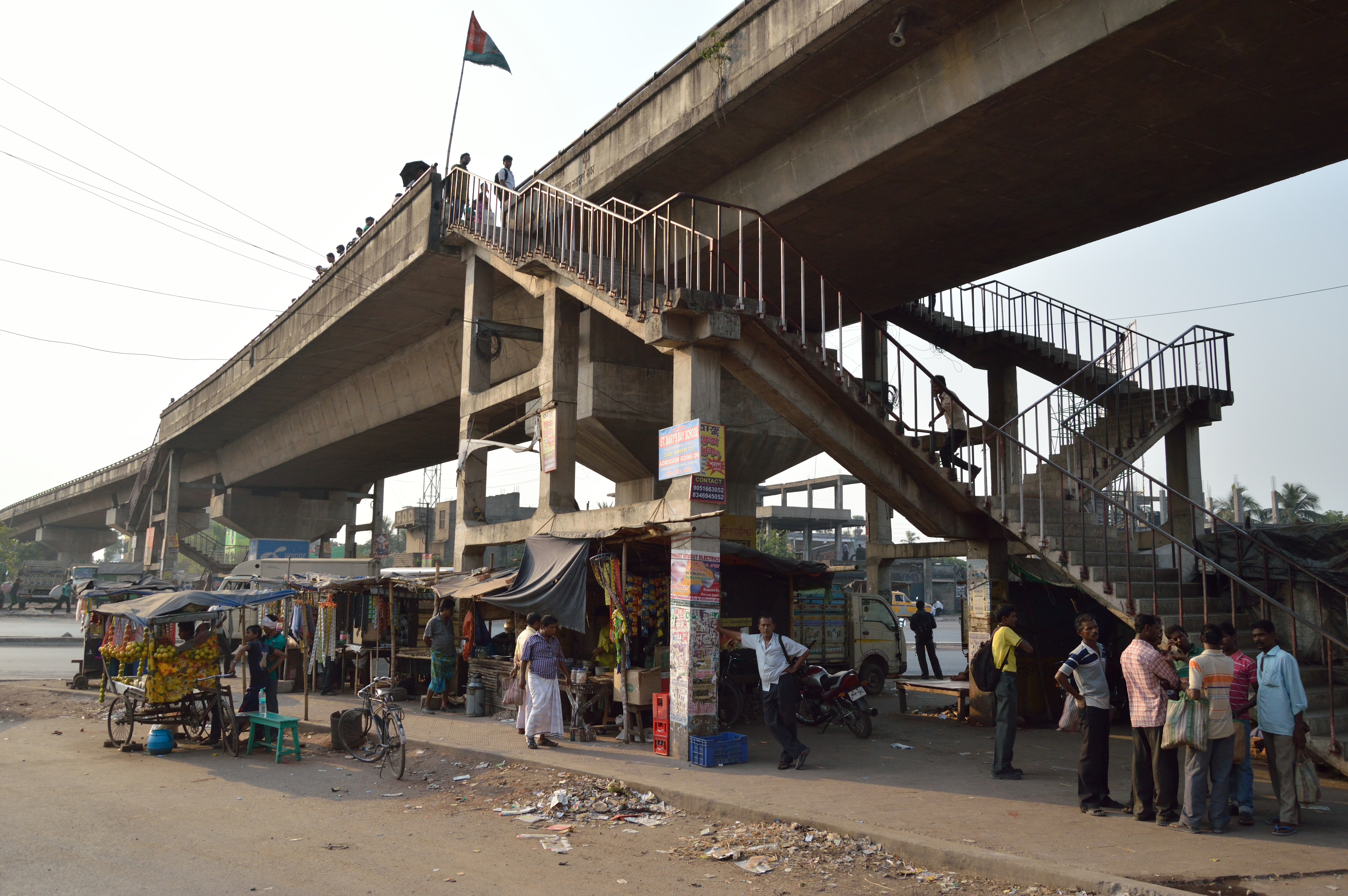
Makardaha Road Flyover crossing above National Highway 16/ Asian Highway 45, Salap More

Salap is located at 22.61°N 88.27°E.

== Demographics ==
As per 2011 Census of India Salap had a total population of 15,171 of which 7,826 (52%) were males and 7,345 (48%) were females. Population below 6 years was 1,413. The total number of literates in Salap was 11,830 (85.99% of the population over 6 years).

Salap was part of Kolkata Urban Agglomeration in 2011 census.

As of 2001 India census, Salap had a population of 11,759. Males constitute 52% of the population and females 48%. Salap has an average literacy rate of 75%, higher than the national average of 59.5%: male literacy is 80% and female literacy is 69%. In Salap, 11% of the population is under 6 years of age.

== Transport ==
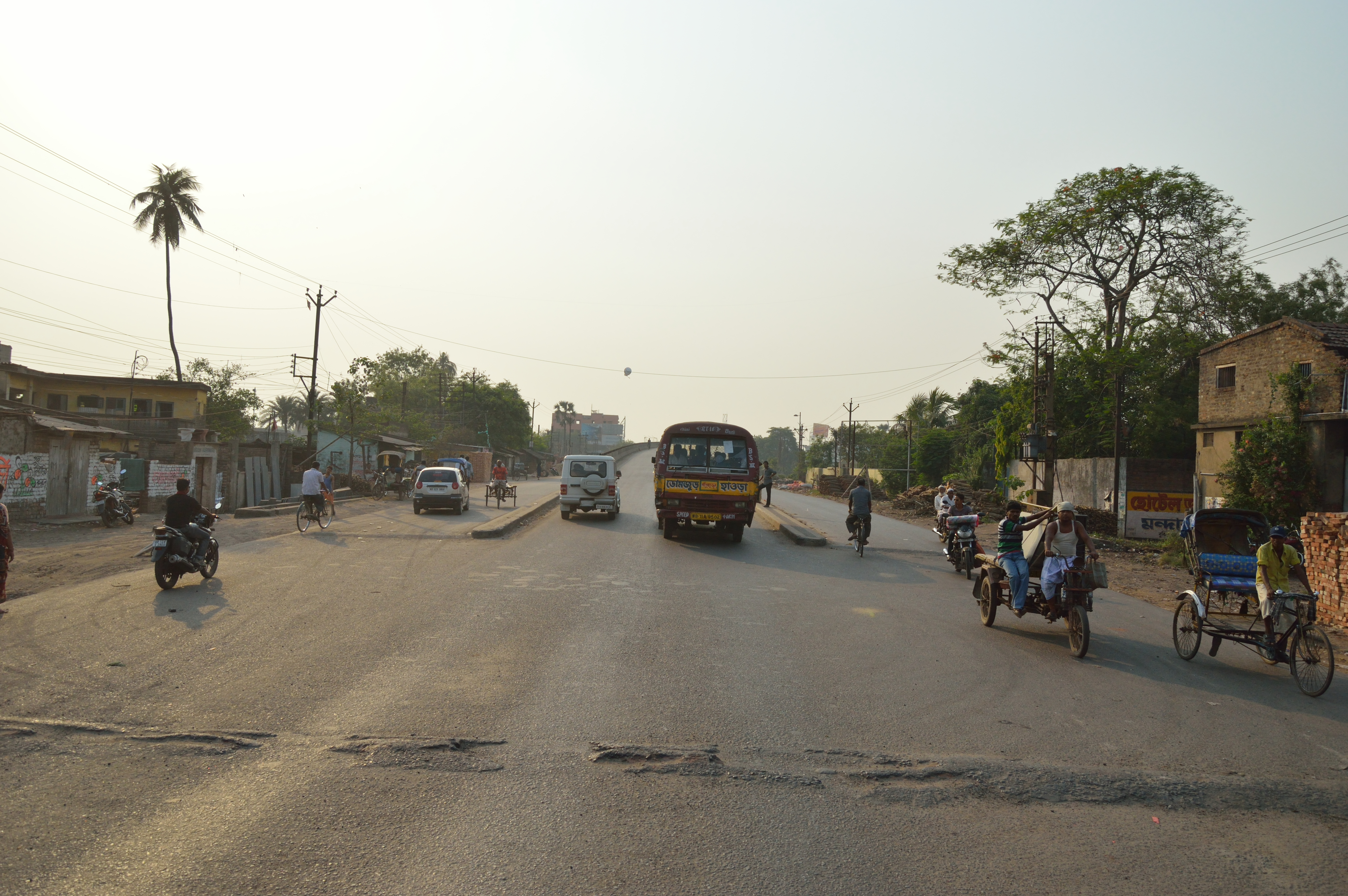
Makardaha Road, Salap

Salap is the junction of National Highway 16 (part of Asian Highway 45) also called Mumbai Road and Makardaha Road (part of State Highway 15). People can easily go to several areas of Kolkata, Howrah and Hooghly from here.

=== Bus ===
==== Private Bus ====
- 63 Domjur - Howrah Station
- 79 Panchla - Dunlop
- E43 Dihibhursut - Howrah Station
- E44 Rampur - Howrah Station
- E53 Narit - Howrah Station
- K11 Domjur - Rabindra Sadan
- L3 Jhikhira/Muchighata - Howrah Station
- 31(mini)- Makardaha - Khidirpur

==== WBTC Express Bus ====
- E77- Sukanta Park-Dharmatala

==== NDRTC ====
- Rashbehari Avenue- Dhulagarh
- Dhulagarh-Chingrighata
- Shyambazar- Bagnan

==== Without Bus Number ====
- Salap - Nagerbazar
- Salap - Barrackpore

Many Shuttle Buses (Without Numbers) also pass through Salap.

=== Train ===
Dansi railway station is the nearest railway station on Howrah-Amta line.

== Bank ==
In Salap town there is Govt Bank such as Paschim Banga Gramin Bank as well as Private Bank such as Bandhan Bank exists. There is also several ATMs exists such as IndusInd Bank and Punjab National Bank.

== Infrastructure ==
Kolkata West International City is a proposed satellite township development at Salap in Howrah district in the form of a joint-venture between two Indonesian conglomerates - Salim Group, Ciputra Development - and Singapore -based Universal Success Group.

Realty major Shapoorji Pallonji Real Estate has announced the launch of a new phase at Joyville Howrah near Salap, West Bengal. The new phase will have around 240 units of 2 BHK and 3 BHK configuration, ranging from 621 sq. ft. to 831 sq.
