= Abada railway station =

Railway station in West Bengal, India

Abada

General information
- Location: Abada, Howrah district
- Coordinates: 22°32′52″N 88°11′58″E
- System: Kolkata Suburban Railway
- Owner: Indian Railways
- Line: Howrah–Kharagpur line
- Platforms: 3

Construction
- Structure type: Standard on-ground station
- Parking: No
- Cycle facilities: No

Other information
- Status: Active
- Station code: ABB
- Fare zone: South Eastern Railway

Services
| Preceding station | Kolkata Suburban Railway | Following station |
|---|---|---|
| Nalpur towards Midnapore | South Eastern Line Howrah–Kharagpur line | Sankrail towards Howrah Junction |
Route map
Location
- Location within West Bengal Location within India

The Abada railway station in the Indian state of West Bengal, serves Abada, India in Howrah district. It is on the Howrah–Kharagpur line. It is 18 km (11 mi) from Howrah Station.

== History ==
The Howrah–Kharagpur line was opened in 1900. Bengal Nagpur Railway opened to traffic its main line from Nagpur to Asansol in 1891. Sini, on the Nagpur–Asansol line, was connected to Kharagpur and Kolaghat in 1898–99. The Kharagpur–Cuttack section was also opened the same year. The Kolaghat–Howrah track was completed in 1899–1900. Kharagpur was connected to Howrah with the opening of the Rupnarayan bridge on 19 April 1900.[11]

The Panskura–Durgachak line was opened in 1968, at a time when Haldia Port was being constructed. It was subsequently extended to Haldia. Haldia Dock Complex, a part of Kolkata Port Trust, was commissioned in 1977.[11][12]

The Tamluk–Digha line was opened in 2004.[13]

== Tracks ==
The Howrah–Panskura stretch has three lines.

== Electrification ==
The Howrah–Kharagpur line was electrified in 1967–69.

The Howrah–Kharagpur line was electrified in 1967–69. The Panskura–Haldia line was electrified in 1974–76. Santragachi–Bankaranayabaj sector was electrified in 1984–85. All lines were electrified with 25 kV AC overhead system.[14] EMU train services between Panskura and Haldia introduced in 1976 and direct EMU services between Howrah and Haldia in 1979.[11]

== Passenger movement ==
Abada railway station handles around 6 passengers every day.
