= Sarenga =

- Census Town
- Location in West Bengal, India Sarenga (India)
- Coordinates: 22.54°N 88.21°E
- Country: India
- State: West Bengal
- District: Howrah
- Elevation: 6 m (20 ft)

Population (2011)
  - Total: 25,200

Languages
  - Official: Bengali, English
- Time zone: UTC+5:30 (IST)
- ISO 3166 code: IN-WB
- Vehicle registration: WB
- Lok Sabha constituency: Howrah
- Vidhan Sabha constituency: Sankrail
- Website: howrah.gov.in

Sarenga is a census town in Sankrail CD Block of Howrah Sadar subdivision in Howrah district in the Indian state of West Bengal.

== Geography ==
Sarenga is located at 22.54°N 88.21°E. It has an average elevation of 6 m (20 ft).

== Demographics ==
As per 2011 Census of India Sarenga had a total population of 25,200 of which 12,798 (51%) were males and 12,402 (49%) were females. Population below 6 years was 3,085. The total number of literates in Sarenga was 17,041 (77.06% of the population over 6 years).

Sarenga was part of Kolkata Urban Agglomeration in 2011 census.

As of 2001 India census, Sarenga had a population of 21,621. Males constitute 51% of the population and females 49%. Sarenga has an average literacy rate of 59%, lower than the national average of 59.5%: male literacy is 64% and female literacy is 54%. In Sarenga, 12% of the population is under 6 years of age.

== Transport ==
=== Bus ===
- Sarenga (Kolatala More) - New Town Unitech

=== Train ===
Abada railway station on Howrah-Kharagpur line is the nearest railway station.
