= Howrah Lok Sabha constituency =

Lok Sabha constituency in West Bengal

Coordinates: 22°34′25″N 88°19′30″E

Howrah WB-25
- Lok Sabha constituency
- Interactive Map Outlining Howrah Lok Sabha Constituency

Constituency details
- Country: India
- Region: East India
- State: West Bengal
- Assembly constituencies: Bally; Howrah Uttar; Howrah Madhya; Shibpur; Howrah Dakshin; Sankrail; Panchla
- Established: 1951
- Total electors: 1,505,099
- Reservation: None

Member of Parliament
- 18th Lok Sabha
- Incumbent Prasun Banerjee
- Party: NCPI
- Alliance: NDA
- Elected year: 2024

Howrah Lok Sabha constituency (Bengali: হাওড়া লোকসভা কেন্দ্র) is one of the 543 parliamentary constituencies in India. The constituency centeres on Howrah in West Bengal. All the seven assembly segments of No. 25 Howrah Lok Sabha constituency are in Howrah district.

== Overview ==
Parliamentary constituencies in West Bengal - 1. Cooch Behar, 2. Alipurduars, 3. Jalpaiguri, 4. Darjeeling, 5. Raiganj, 6. Balurghat, 7. Maldaha Uttar, 8. Maldaha Dakshin, 9. Jangipur, 10. Baharampur, 11. Murshidabad, 12. Krishnanagar, 13. Ranaghat, 14. Bangaon, 15. Barrackpore, 16. Dum Dum, 17. Barasat, 18. Basirhat, 19. Jaynagar, 20. Mathurapur, 21. Diamond Harbour, 22. Jadavpur, 23. Kolkata Dakshin, 24. Kolkata Uttar, 25. Howrah, 26. Uluberia, 27. Serampore, 28. Hooghly, 29. Arambagh, 30. Tamluk, 31, Kanthi, 32. Ghatal, 33. Jhargram, 34. Medinipur, 35. Purulia, 36. Bankura, 37. Bishnupur, 38. Bardhaman Purba, 39. Bardhaman Durgapur, 40. Asansol, 41. Bolpur, 42. Birbhum

The Hindustan Times reported, “Howrah is a 500-year-old urban agglomeration on the western bank of the Hooghly River and is best known for unplanned, densely populated habitation, one of the country's biggest rail terminuses, and a rusty manufacturing sector, especially iron foundries.”

About the foundry industry The Times of India wrote, “Some have already downed their shutters. Others keep open for three days a week. A cut in wages has been accepted by the workers, mostly without even a grumble. The foundry industry of Howrah, once known as the Sheffield of India and one of the largest employers in the state, is now gasping for breath.”

According to The Hindu, Howrah and Sreerampur constituencies have more than 25% non-Bengali voters with their roots in Rajasthan, Bihar or Uttar Pradesh.

== Assembly segments ==
As per order of the Delimitation Commission issued in 2006 in respect of the delimitation of constituencies in the West Bengal, parliamentary constituency no. 25 Howrah is composed of the following segments:

#	Name	District	Member	Party	2024 Lead
169	Bally	Howrah	Sanjay Singh	BJP	AITC
170	Howrah Uttar	Howrah	Umesh Rai	BJP	AITC
171	Howrah Madhya	Howrah	Arup Roy	AITC	AITC
172	Shibpur	Howrah	Rudranil Ghosh	BJP	AITC
173	Howrah Dakshin	Howrah	Nandita Chowdhury	AITC	AITC
174	Sankrail (SC)	Howrah	Priya Paul	AITC	AITC
175	Panchla	Howrah	Gulsan Mullick	AITC	AITC

Prior to delimitation, the constituency was composed of the following assembly segments:

- Bally (AC 161)
- Howrah North (AC 162)
- Howrah Central (AC 163)
- Howrah South (AC 164)
- Shibpur (AC 165)
- Domjur (AC 166)
- Sankrail (SC) (AC 169)

== Members of Parliament ==
Year	Member	Party
1952	Santosh Kumar Dutta	Indian National Congress
1957	Mohammed Elias	Communist Party of India
1962	Mohammed Elias	Communist Party of India
1967	K. K. Chatterjee	Indian National Congress
1971	Samar Mukherjee	Communist Party of India (Marxist)
1977	Samar Mukherjee	Communist Party of India (Marxist)
1980	Samar Mukherjee	Communist Party of India (Marxist)
1984	Priya Ranjan Dasmunsi	Indian National Congress
1989	Susanta Chakraborty	Communist Party of India (Marxist)
1991	Susanta Chakraborty	Communist Party of India (Marxist)
1996	Priya Ranjan Dasmunsi	Indian National Congress
1998	Bikram Sarkar	All India Trinamool Congress
1999	Swadesh Chakraborty	Communist Party of India (Marxist)
2004	Swadesh Chakraborty	Communist Party of India (Marxist)
2009	Ambica Banerjee	All India Trinamool Congress
2013^	Prasun Banerjee	All India Trinamool Congress
2014	Prasun Banerjee	All India Trinamool Congress
2019	Prasun Banerjee	All India Trinamool Congress
2024	Prasun Banerjee	All India Trinamool Congress
2026 (Note: Switched to NCPI as part of AITC Rebels in Lok Sabha.)	Prasun Banerjee	Nationalist Citizens Party of India

== Election results ==
Vote share of Winning candidates
2024	49.26%
2019	47.18%
2014	43.40%
2013 (bypoll)	44.68%
2009	48.02%
2004	53.69%
1999	49.98%
1998	43.18%
1996	47.89%
1991	44.71%
1989	48.63%
1984	56.28%
1980	53.00%
1977	62.70%
1971	47.70%
1967	46.65%
1962	42.37%
1957	48.30%
1952	34.22%

=== 2024 ===
2024 Indian general elections: Howrah
Party	Candidate	Votes	%	±%
AITC	Prasun Banerjee	626,493	49.26	▲2.08
BJP	Rathin Chakraborty	457,051	35.94	▼2.79
CPI(M)	Sabyasachi Chatterjee	152,005	11.95	▲3.31
NOTA	None of the above	10,000	0.79	
Majority		1,69,442	3.9	
Turnout				
AITC hold		Swing		

=== 2019 ===
2019 Indian general elections: Howrah
Party	Candidate	Votes	%	±%
AITC	Prasun Banerjee	576,711	47.18	▲4.53
BJP	Rantidev Sengupta	473,016	38.73	▲25.42
CPI(M)	Sumitro Adhikary	152005	8.64	▼5.44
INC	Suvra Ghosh	32,107	2.63	▼2.68
IND	Sekhar Mondal	6,447	0.53	
NOTA	None of the above	6,337	0.52	
Majority		1,03,695	8.48	
Turnout		12,22,708	74.83	+0.04
AITC hold		Swing		

=== 2014 ===
2014 Indian general elections: Howrah
Party	Candidate	Votes	%	±%
AITC	Prasun Banerjee	488,461	43.40	
CPI(M)	Srideep Bhattacharya	2,91,505	25.90	
BJP	George Baker	2,48,120	22.05	
INC	Manoj Kumar Pandey	63,254	5.62	
NOTA	None of the above	9,929	0.88	
Majority		1,96,956	17.50	
Turnout		11,25,728	74.79	
AITC hold		Swing		

=== 2013 bypoll ===
Bye-elections 2013: Howrah
Party	Candidate	Votes	%	±%
AITC	Prasun Banerjee	426,387	44.68	
CPI(M)	Srideep Bhattacharya	3,99,422	41.85	
INC	Sanatan Mukherjee	96,743	10.14	
IND	Ranjan Paul	8,921	0.93	
Majority		26,965	2.82	
Turnout		9,54,850	65.99	
AITC hold		Swing		

=== 2009 ===
2009 Indian general elections: Howrah
Party	Candidate	Votes	%	±%
AITC	Ambica Banerjee	477,449	48.02	
CPI(M)	Swadesh Chakrabortty	4,40,057	44.26	
BJP	Polly Mukherjee	37,723	3.79	
SP	Bijoy Uppadhya	8,615	0.87	
IND	Subarna Chakraborty	8,180	0.82	
Majority		37,392	3.76	
Turnout		9,93,958	73.91	
AITC gain from CPI(M)		Swing		

=== 2004 ===
2004 Indian general election: Howrah
Party	Candidate	Votes	%	±%
CPI(M)	Swadesh Chakraborty	489,444	53.69	
AITC	Dr. Bikram Sarkar	242,507	26.60	
INC	Sultan Singh	152,100	16.68	
JD(S)	Anup Dey	4,013	0.44	
BSP	Rabindra Kumar Jaiswal	2,864	0.31	
IND	9 Independent Candidates	20,704	2.27	
Majority		246,937	27.09	
Turnout				
CPI(M) hold		Swing		

=== 1999 ===
1999 Indian general election: Howrah
Party	Candidate	Votes	%	±%
CPI(M)	Swadesh Chakraborty	490,537	49.98	
AITC	Dr. Kakoli Ghosh Dastidar	387,088	39.44	
INC	Dr. Subhash Chandra Bandyopadhyay	90,592	9.23	
SP	Bijay Kumar Singh	2,952	0.30	
BSP	Ram Bilas Prasad	1,605	0.16	
RJD	Ashok Kumar Agarwal	908	0.09	
JD(S)	Shyam Bihari Singh	824	0.08	
NCP	Rajendra Prasad	195	0.02	
IND	10 Independent Candidates	6,698	0.68	
Majority		103,449	10.54	
Turnout		995,422	72.03	
Swing to CPI(M) from AITC		Swing		

=== 1998 ===
1998 Indian general election: Howrah
Party	Candidate	Votes	%	±%
AITC	Dr. Bikram Sarkar	437,224	43.18	
CPI(M)	Swadesh Chakraborty	430,689	42.54	
INC	Ambica Banerjee	134,787	13.31	
IND	10 Independent Candidates	9,802	0.96	
Majority		6,535	0.64	
Turnout		1,027,782	75.17	
Swing to AITC from INC		Swing		

=== 1996 ===
1996 Indian general election: Howrah
Party	Candidate	Votes	%	±%
INC	Priya Ranjan Dasmunsi	459,059	47.89	
CPI(M)	Susanta Chakraborty	425,128	44.35	
BJP	Ashish Ray	58,367	6.09	
AMB	Anil Baran Das	1,027	0.11	
IND	16 Independent Candidates	14,959	1.56	
Majority		33,931	3.54	
Turnout		985,507	75.17	
Swing to INC from CPI(M)		Swing		

=== 1991 ===
1991 Indian general election: Howrah
Party	Candidate	Votes	%	±%
CPI(M)	Susanta Chakraborty	351,744	44.71	
INC	Priya Ranjan Dasmunsi	344,364	43.77	
BJP	Sachindra Nath Mukherjee	69,136	8.79	
JP	Supapshom Manna	2,095	0.27	
WPI	Tapan Dutta Gupta	1,781	0.23	
BSP	Tapasi Ram	1,658	0.21	
DDP	Rajendra Prasad Kusha	523	0.07	
IND	17 Independent Candidates	15,492	1.96	
Majority		7,380	0.94	
Turnout		801,451	68.72	
CPI(M) hold		Swing		

=== 1989 ===
1989 Indian general election: Howrah
Party	Candidate	Votes	%	±%
CPI(M)	Sushanta Chakraborty	397,138	48.63	
INC	Priya Ranjan Dasmunsi	395,706	48.45	
AIMIM	Molla Zahurul	4,168	0.51	
BSP	Manzurul Mannan	2,041	0.25	
AMB	Anil Baran Das	2,006	0.25	
DDP	Rajendra Prasad Kusha	571	0.07	
IND	14 Independent Candidates	15,037	1.83	
Majority		1,432	0.18	
Turnout		829,059	73.53	
Swing to CPI(M) from INC		Swing		

=== 1984 ===
1984 Indian general election: Howrah
Party	Candidate	Votes	%	±%
INC	Priya Ranjan Dasmunsi	381,216	56.28	
CPI(M)	Samar Mukherjee	287,174	42.40	
IND	Keshab Das	2,329	0.34	
IC(S)	Amiya Bhattacharya	2,016	0.30	
IND	Baboo Ram Tibrewal	1,797	0.27	
IND	Parmeshwar Singh	1,344	0.20	
IND	Kashi Nath Chowdhary	747	0.11	
IND	Jibandhon Mukherji	724	0.11	
Majority		94,042	13.88	
Turnout		689,599	76.70	
Swing to INC from CPI(M)		Swing		

=== 1980 ===
1980 Indian general election: Howrah
Party	Candidate	Votes	%	±%
CPI(M)	Samar Mukherjee	263,337	53.00	
INC(I)	Nityananda Dey	205,028	41.26	
JP	Durgaprasad Nathany	18,538	3.73	
JP(S)	Dwijendra Lal Ghosh	4,718	0.95	
IND	Jibandhan Mukhopadhya	1,661	0.33	
IND	Sailendra Nath Ghosh	1,527	0.31	
IND	Asit Chakravarty	905	0.18	
IND	Karuna Nidhan Roy	580	0.12	
IND	Surya Narain Singh	571	0.11	
Majority		58,309	11.74	
Turnout		508,728	65.54	
CPI(M) hold		Swing		

=== 1977 ===
1977 Indian general election: Howrah
Party	Candidate	Votes	%	±%
CPI(M)	Samar Mukherjee	236,530	62.70	
INC	Nityananda Dey	131,799	34.94	
IND	Samar Mookherjee	4,578	1.21	
IND	Banshi Dhar Banerjee	3,770	1.00	
IND	Jibandhon Mukhopadhya	562	0.15	
Majority		104,731	27.76	
Turnout		389,263	58.13	
CPI(M) hold		Swing		

=== 1971 ===
1971 Indian general election: Howrah
Party	Candidate	Votes	%	±%
CPI(M)	Samar Mukherjee	150,917	47.70	
INC	Mrityunjoy Banerjee	125,875	39.78	
AIFB	Shyam Sundar Gupta	22,464	7.10	
INC(O)	Dev Sadhan Basu	17,154	5.42	
Majority		25,042	7.92	
Turnout		330,787	55.22	
Swing to CPI(M) from INC		Swing		

=== 1967 ===
1967 Indian general election: Howrah
Party	Candidate	Votes	%	±%
INC	K. K. Chatterjee	176,469	46.65	
CPI(M)	S. Mukherjee	134,175	35.47	
CPI	M. Elias	67,626	17.88	
Majority		42,294	11.18	
Turnout		388,788	67.88	
Swing to INC from CPI		Swing		

=== 1962 ===
1962 Indian general election: Howrah
Party	Candidate	Votes	%	±%
CPI	Mohammad Elias	137,812	42.37	
INC	Krishna Kumar Chatterji	133,876	41.16	
ABJS	Haripada Bharati	53,602	16.48	
Majority		3,936	1.21	
Turnout		333,014	62.26	
CPI hold		Swing		

=== 1957 ===
1957 Indian general election: Howrah
Party	Candidate	Votes	%	±%
CPI	Mohammed Elias	108,238	48.30	
INC	Santosh Kr. Dutt	67,403	30.08	
ABJS	Haripada Bharati	48,457	21.62	
Majority		40,835	18.22	
Turnout		224,098	48.60	
Swing to CPI from INC		Swing		

=== 1952 ===
1952 Indian general election: Howrah
Party	Candidate	Votes	%	±%
INC	Santosh Kumar Dutta	60,929	34.22	
CPI	Anil Kumar Sarkar	59,163	33.22	
KMPP	Bejoy Krishna Bhattacharya	37,989	21.33	
IND	Raghabendra Nath Banerjee	15,567	8.74	
Socialist	Sibnath Bandopadhyay	4,423	2.48	
Majority		1,766	0.99	
Turnout		178,071	46.99	
INC win (new seat)				

== See also ==
- List of constituencies of the Lok Sabha
