= Sankrail Assembly constituency =

Sankrail
- Constituency No. 174 for the West Bengal Legislative Assembly
- Interactive Map Outlining Sankrail Assembly Constituency

Constituency details
- Country: India
- Region: East India
- State: West Bengal
- District: Howrah
- Lok Sabha constituency: Howrah
- Established: 1951
- Total electors: 211,076
- Reservation: SC

Member of Legislative Assembly
- 18th West Bengal Legislative Assembly
- Incumbent Priya Paul
- Party: Democratic Trinamool Congress
- Elected year: 2026

Sankrail Assembly constituency is an assembly constituency in Howrah district in the Indian state of West Bengal. It is reserved for scheduled castes.

== Overview ==
As per orders of the Delimitation Commission, No. 174 Sankrail Assembly constituency (SC) is composed of the following: Andul, Banpur I, Banpur II, Dakshin Sankrail, Dhulagari, Kandua, Manikpur, Mashila, Nalpur, Raghudebbati, Sankrail, Sarenga gram panchayats of Sankrail community development block and Kolora I, Kolora II, Mahiyari I, Mahiyari II gram panchayats of Domjur community development block.

Sankrail Assembly constituency is part of No. 25 Howrah (Lok Sabha constituency).

== Members of the Legislative Assembly ==
Year	Name	Party
1951	Kanai Lal Bhattacharya	All India Forward Bloc (Ruikar)
1951	Kripa Sindhu Shaw	All India Forward Bloc (Ruikar)
1957	Shyamaprasanna Bhattacharyya	Communist Party of India
1957	Apurba Lal Mazumdar	All India Forward Bloc (Marxist)
1962	Dulal Chandra Mondal	Communist Party of India
1967	N. N. Bhuniya	Indian National Congress
1969	Haran Hazra	Communist Party of India (Marxist)
1971	Haran Hazra	Communist Party of India (Marxist)
1972	Haran Hazra	Communist Party of India (Marxist)
1977	Haran Hazra	Communist Party of India (Marxist)
1982	Haran Hazra	Communist Party of India (Marxist)
1987	Haran Hazra	Communist Party of India (Marxist)
1991	Haran Hazra	Communist Party of India (Marxist)
1996	Sital Kumar Sardar	Indian National Congress
2001	Sital Kumar Sardar	Trinamool Congress
2006	Sital Kumar Sardar	Trinamool Congress
2011	Sital Kumar Sardar	Trinamool Congress
2016	Sital Kumar Sardar	Trinamool Congress
2021	Priya Paul	Trinamool Congress
2026	Priya Paul	Trinamool Congress

== Election results ==
=== 2026 ===
2026 West Bengal Legislative Assembly election: Sankrail
Party	Candidate	Votes	%	±%
AITC	Priya Paul	105,412	45.99	▼4.38
BJP	Barnali Dhali	88,672	38.69	▲6.52
CPI(M)	Samir Malick	29,178	12.73	▼2.64
INC	Bechu Ram Malik	2,221	0.97	
NOTA	None of the above	1,769	0.77	▼0.06
Majority		16,740	7.3	▼10.9
Turnout		229,210	95.37	▲15.2
AITC hold		Swing		

=== 2021 ===
2021 West Bengal Legislative Assembly election: Sankrail
Party	Candidate	Votes	%	±%
AITC	Priya Paul	111,888	50.37	▲5.6
BJP	Prabhakar Pandit	71,461	32.17	▲17.7
CPI(M)	Samir Malick	34,144	15.37	
NOTA	None of the above	1,850	0.83	
Majority		40,427	18.2	
Turnout		222,127	80.17	
AITC hold		Swing		

=== 2016 ===
West Bengal assembly elections, 2016: Sankrail
Party	Candidate	Votes	%	±%
AITC	Sital Kumar Sardar	86,212	45.20	▼6.01
CPI(M)	Samir Malick	71,455	37.50	▼3.32
BJP	Probhakar Pandit	28,006	14.70	
Turnout				
AITC hold		Swing		

=== 2011 ===
West Bengal assembly elections, 2011: Sankrail (SC) constituency
Party	Candidate	Votes	%	±%
AITC	Sital Kumar Sardar	88,029	51.21	▼0.51
CPI(M)	Anirban Hazra	70,172	40.82	▼3.86
BJP	Jhan Prakash Ray	8,184		
Independent	Srikanta Mondal	1,735		
BSP	Soma Sardar	1,388		
Independent	Bhishma Bag	772		
Indian Unity Centre	Upendra Nath Dolui	658		
Independent	Sankar Das	603		
Independent	Balai Pandit	356		
Turnout		171,897	81.44	
AITC hold		Swing	3.35#	

.# Swing calculated on Congress+Trinamool Congress vote percentages taken together in 2006.

=== 2006 ===
In the 2006, 2001 1996 state assembly elections, Sital Kumar Sardar of Trinamool Congress / Congress won the 169 Sankrail (SC) assembly seat, defeating his nearest rivals Anirban Hazara of CPI(M).Bikash Mondal of CPI(M) in 2001 and Basudeb Dhali of CPI(M) in 1996. Contests in most years were multi cornered but only winners and runners are being mentioned. Haran Hazra of CPI(M) defeated Nityananda Bhuniya of Congress/ Janata Party in 1991, 1987, 1982 and 1977.

=== 1972 ===
Haran Hazra of CPI(M) won in 1972, 1971 and 1969. N.N.Bhuniya of Congress won in 1967. Dulal Chandra Mondal of CPI won in 1962. In 1957 and 1951 Sankrail had joint seats. Shyama Prasanna Bhattacharya of CPI and Apurbalal Mazumdar of Forward Bloc (Marxist) won in 1957. Kanai Lal Bhattacharya and Kripa Sindhu Shaw, both of Forward Bloc (Ruiker), won in 1951.
