= Howrah district =

District in West Bengal, India

- District of West Bengal
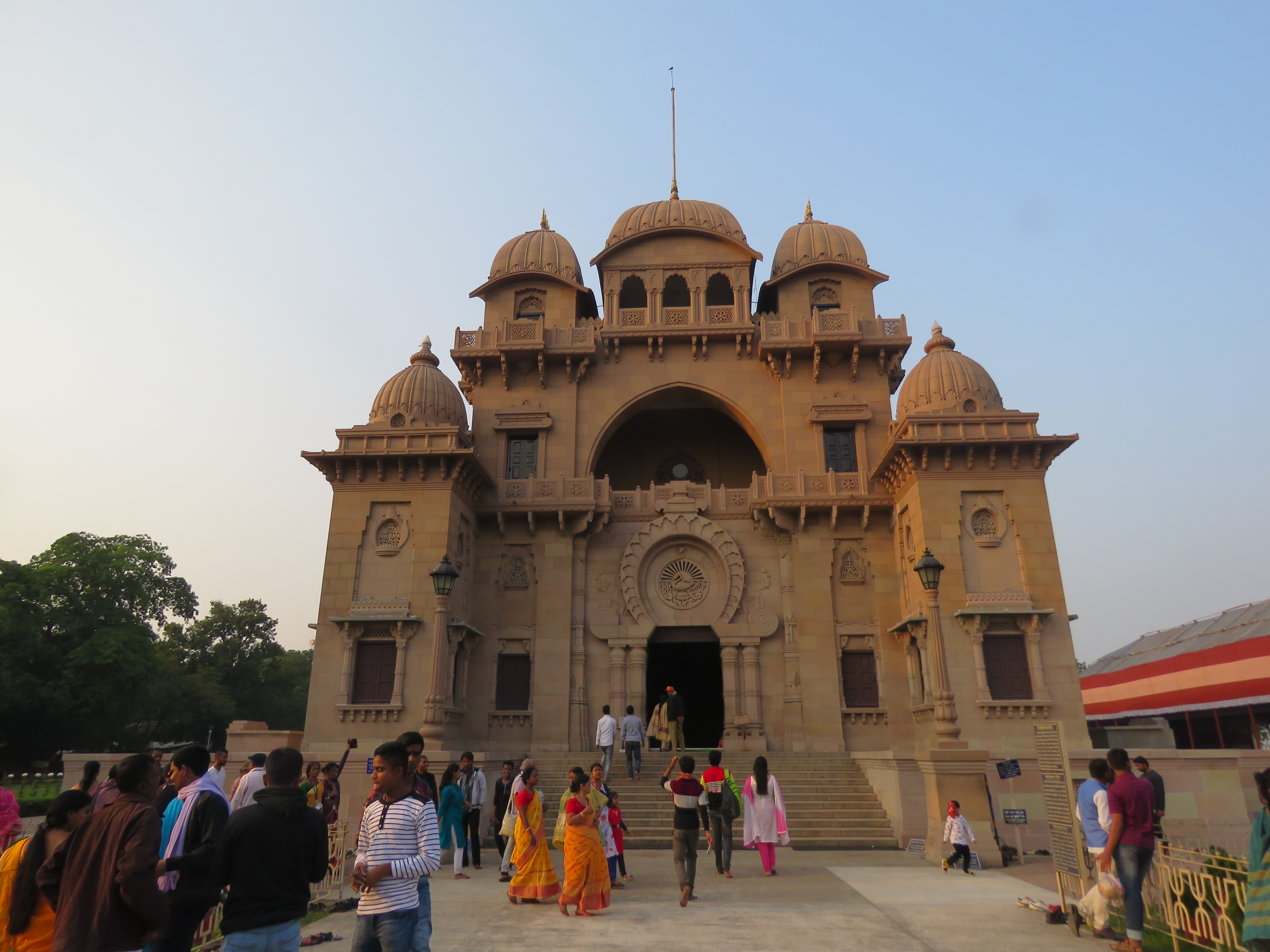
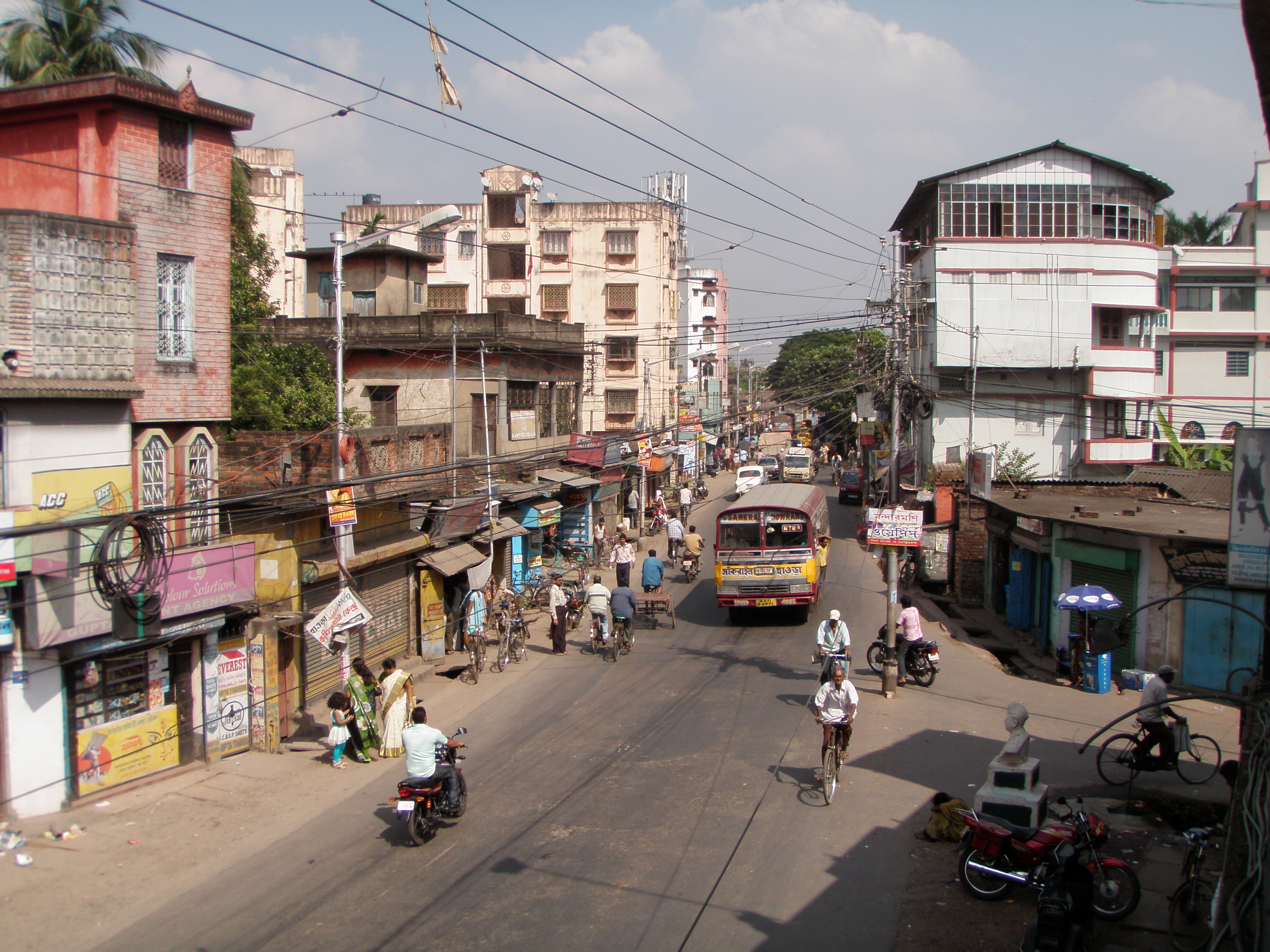
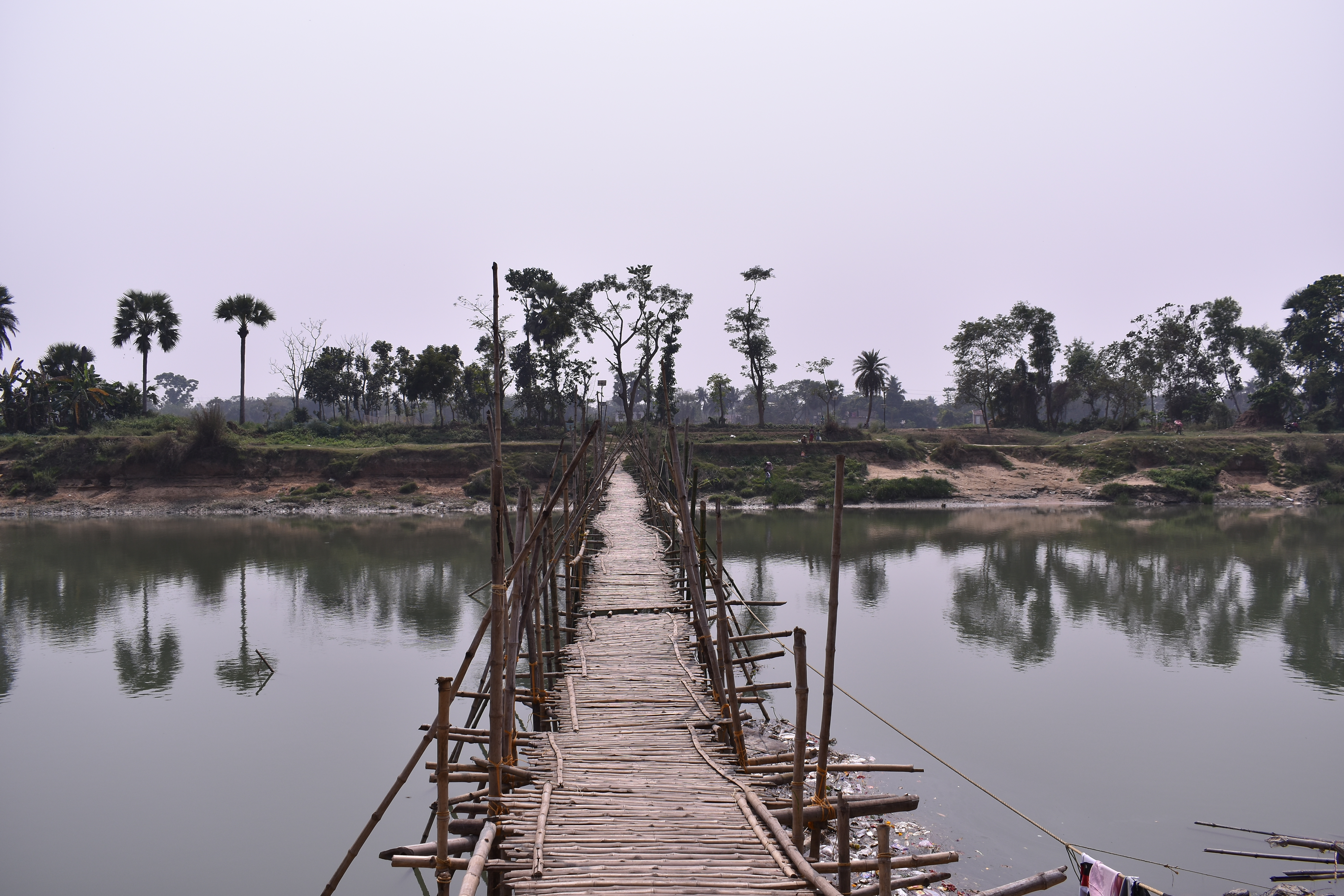
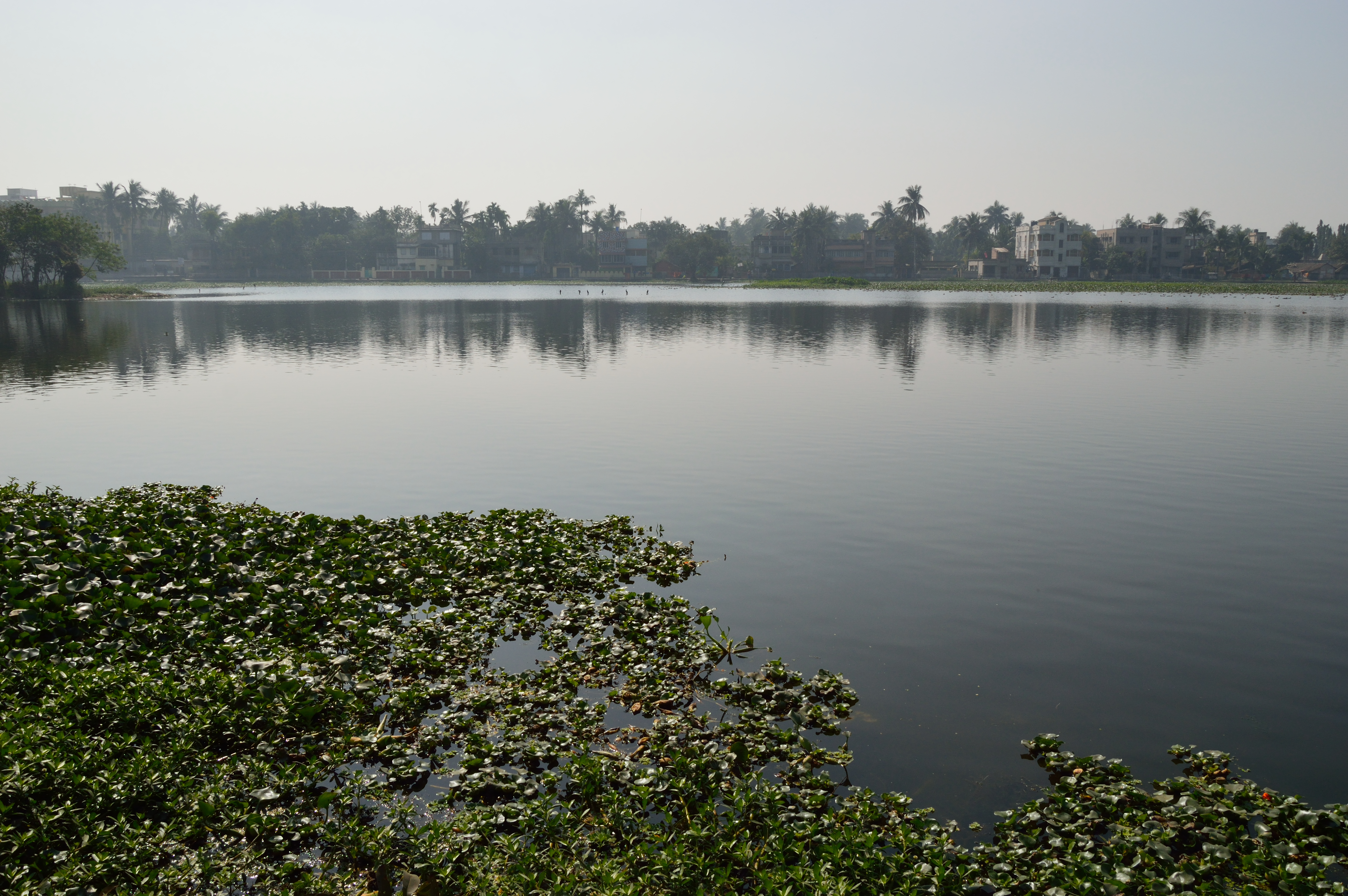
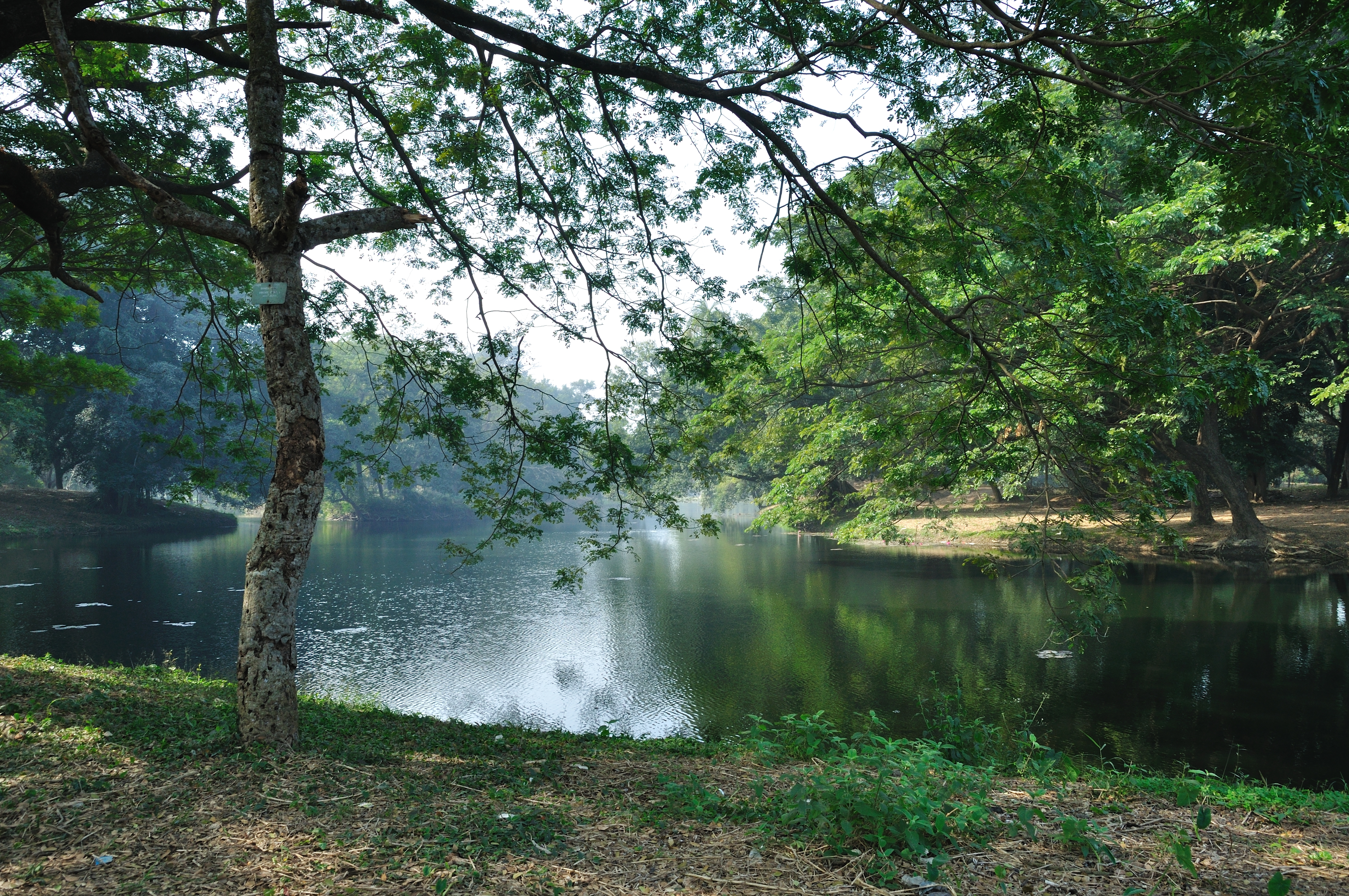
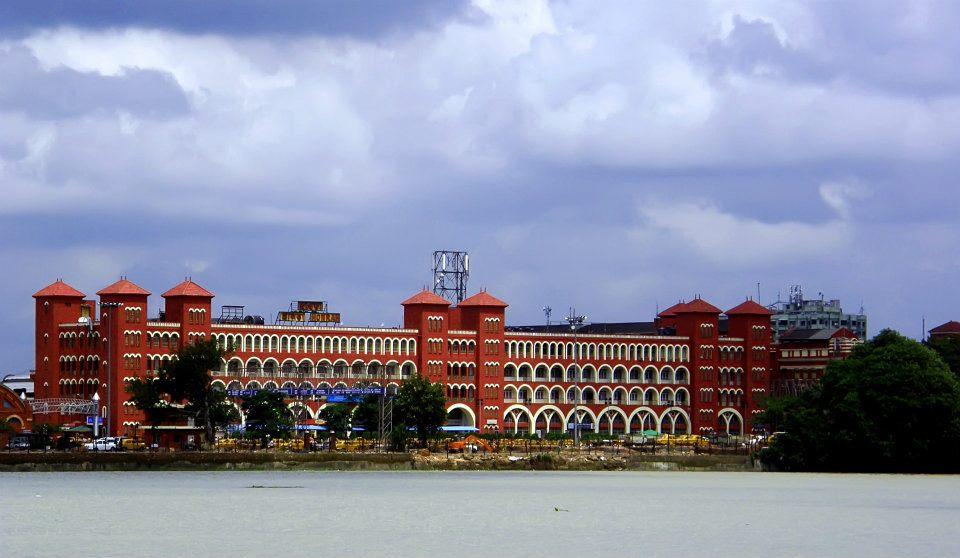
- Clockwise from top-left: Belur Math, Andul Road and Danesh Sheikh Junction in Howrah, Santragachhi Lake, Acharya Jagadish Chandra Bose Indian Botanic Garden, Tarani Majhi Ghat at Raspur, Howrah railway station

- Location of Howrah district in West Bengal
- Coordinates: 22.5736296°N 88.3251045°E
- Country: India
- State: West Bengal
- Division: Presidency
- Headquarters: Howrah

Government
  - Subdivisions: Howrah Sadar, Uluberia
  - CD Blocks: Bally Jagachha, Domjur, Panchla, Sankrail, Jagatballavpur, Amta I, Amta II, Bagnan I, Bagnan II, Uluberia I, Uluberia II, Shyampur I, Shyampur II, Udaynarayanpur
  - Lok Sabha constituencies: Howrah, Uluberia, Serampore
  - Vidhan Sabha constituencies: Howrah Uttar, Howrah Madhya, Shibpur, Howrah Dakshin, Bally, Sankrail, Panchla, Uluberia Purba, Uluberia Uttar, Uluberia Dakshin, Shyampur, Bagnan, Amta, Udaynarayanpur, Jagatballavpur, Domjur

Area
  - Total: 1,467 km^{2} (566 sq mi)

Population (2011)
  - Total: 4,850,029
  - Density: 3,306/km^{2} (8,563/sq mi)
  - Urban: 3,074,144

Demographics
  - Literacy: 83.31 per cent
  - Sex ratio: 935 ♂/♀

Languages
  - Official: Bengali
  - Additional official: English
- Time zone: UTC+05:30 (IST)
- Website: howrah.gov.in

Howrah district (/ˈhaʊrə/, Bengali: [ˈɦao̯ɽa]) is a district of the West Bengal state in eastern India. Howrah district is one of the most highly urbanized areas in West Bengal. It has thousands of years of rich heritage in the form of the great Bengali kingdom of Bhurshut. The district is named after its headquarters, the city of Howrah.

== Geography ==
Map of Howrah District

The Howrah district lies between 22°48′ N and 22°12′ N latitudes and between 88°23′ E and 87°50′ E longitudes. The district is bounded by the Hooghly River and the North 24 Parganas and South 24 Parganas districts on the east, on the north by the Hooghly district (Arambagh and Shrirampur sub-divisions), and on the south by Midnapore East district (Tamluk sub-division). On the west Howrah district is bordered by the Ghatal sub-division of Midnapore West district, and partly by the Arambagh sub-division of Hooghly district to the north-west, and the Tamluk sub-division of Midnapore East district to the south-west.

Boundaries of the district are naturally determined by Rupnarayan River on west and south-west, and by Bhagirathi-Hooghly river on east and south-east side. On north side, the boundary is an artificial one except for Bally Canal on north-east and Damodar River on north-west.

Annual normal rainfall is 1461 millimetre per year. Annual maximum temperature varies between 32-39 °C, whereas minimum temperature varies between 8-10 °C.

== Divisions ==
Howrah District is split into the Howrah Sadar subdivision and the Uluberia subdivision. The Howrah Sadar subdivision has 1 municipal corporation with 1 municipality and 5 community development (CD) blocks. The Uluberia subdivision has 1 municipality and 9 community development blocks.

Each block consists of a rural area divided into gram panchayats along with census towns. The district has 30 police stations (Howrah Police Commissionerate has 16 general police stations including 1 Women PS, 1 Cyber Crime PS and Howrah Rural PD has 10 general police stations including 1 Women PS, 1 Cyber Crime PS), 157 gram panchayats and 50 census towns.

Area	Subdivision	Type	Notes
Howrah Municipal Corporation	Howrah Sadar	Municipal Corporation	includes the merged Bally Municipality and total number of wards is sixty six now
Bally Jagachha	Howrah Sadar	CD Block	consists of rural area with 8 gram panchayats and six census towns: Bally (different from Bally municipality), Chakapara, Chamrail, Eksara, Khalia and Jagadishpur Durgapur-Avoynagar1, Durgapur-Avoynagar2, Nischinda
Domjur	Howrah Sadar	CD Block	consists of rural area with 18 gram panchayats and sixteen census towns: Domjur, Dakshin Jhapardaha, Khantora, Bhandardaha, Makardaha, Kantlia, Tentulkuli, Salap, Bankra, Nibra, Ankurhati, Bipra Noapara, Kalara, Kesabpur, Natibpur, and Mahiari
Panchla	Howrah Sadar	CD Block	consists of rural area with 11 gram panchayats and seven census towns: Bikihakola, Beldubi, Deulpur, Gangadharpur, Jujersha, Jala-Biswanathpur, Banaharishpur, Chara-Panchla, Panchla, Subharara and Sahapur
Sankrail	Howrah Sadar	CD Block	consists of rural area with 16 gram panchayats and fourteen census towns: Argari, Dhuilya, Andul, Ramchandrapur, Podara, Panchpara, Hatgachha, Jhorhat, Banipur, Mashila, Sankrail, Manikpur, Nalpur, Raghudebbati and Sarenga
Jagatballavpur	Howrah Sadar	CD Block	consists of rural area with 14 gram panchayats and two census town: Mansinhapur and Munsirhat
Uluberia Municipality	Uluberia	Municipality	
Amta I	Uluberia	CD Block	CD block consists of rural area with 13 gram panchayats and Two census town: Amta and Guzarpur
Amta II	Uluberia	CD Block	CD block consists of rural area only with 14 gram panchayats and three census town: Khorop, Narit and Joypur
Bagnan I	Uluberia	CD Block	CD block consists of rural area with 10 gram panchayats and two census towns: Khalor and Bagnan
Bagnan II	Uluberia	CD Block	CD block consists of rural area with 7 gram panchayats and one census town: Naupala
Uluberia I	Uluberia	CD Block	CD block consists of rural area only with 9 gram panchayats.The most important village is Bar-Mongrajpur under Hatgacha-1 G.P.
Uluberia II	Uluberia	CD Block	CD block consists of rural area with 8 gram panchayats and three census towns: Santoshpur, Balaram Pota and Uttar Pirpur
Shyampur I	Uluberia	CD Block	CD block consists of rural area only with 10 gram panchayats
Shyampur II	Uluberia	CD Block	CD block consists of rural area only with 8 gram panchayats
Udaynarayanpur	Uluberia	CD Block	CD block consists of rural area only with 11 gram panchayats

== Demographics ==
Historical population
Year	Pop.	±% p.a.
1901	850,514	—
1911	943,502	+1.04%
1921	997,403	+0.56%
1931	1,098,867	+0.97%
1941	1,490,304	+3.09%
1951	1,611,373	+0.78%
1961	2,038,477	+2.38%
1971	2,417,286	+1.72%
1981	2,966,861	+2.07%
1991	3,729,644	+2.31%
2001	4,273,099	+1.37%
2011	4,850,029	+1.27%

According to the 2011 census Howrah district has a population of 4,850,029, roughly equal to the nation of Singapore or the US state of Alabama. This gives it a ranking of 23rd in India (out of a total of 640). The district has a population density of 3,306 inhabitants per square kilometre (8,560/sq mi). Its population growth rate over the decade 2001-2011 was 13.31%. 63.38% of the population lives in urban areas. Haora has a sex ratio of 935 females for every 1000 males and a literacy rate of 83.85%. 63.38% of the population lives in urban areas. Scheduled Castes and Scheduled Tribes make up 14.82% and 0.31% of the population respectively.

Total area in Howrah District is 1467 km^{2}. Total population is 4,273,099 as per census 2001 records. 57.91% of the population live in Howrah Sadar subdivision and rest 42.09% live in Uluberia subdivision. Population Density: 2913 per km^{2}.

=== Religion ===
Religion in Howrah district (2011 census)
1. Hinduism (72.9%)
2. Islam (26.2%)
3. No religion (0.38%)
4. Jainism (0.20%)
5. Christianity (0.18%)
6. Sikhism (0.09%)
7. Buddhism (0.03%)
8. Other religions (0.03%)

Religion in Howrah district
Religion	Population (1941)	Percentage (1941)	Population (2011)	Percentage (2011)
Hinduism	1,184,863	79.50%	3,535,844	72.90%
Islam	296,325	19.88%	1,270,641	26.20%
Others (Note: Including Jainism, Christianity, Buddhism, Zoroastrianism, Judaism, Ad-Dharmis, or not stated)	9,116	0.61%	43,544	0.90%
Total Population	1,490,304	100%	4,850,029	100%

Hindus are the majority population. Muslims, unlike the rest of Bengal, are more concentrated in urban areas than Hindus. Muslims are a significant minority in Panchla (46.62%), Uluberia I (43.92%), Uluberia II (39.36%) and Bagnan I (36.74%) blocks and make up a significant minority (44.79%) in Uluberia city.

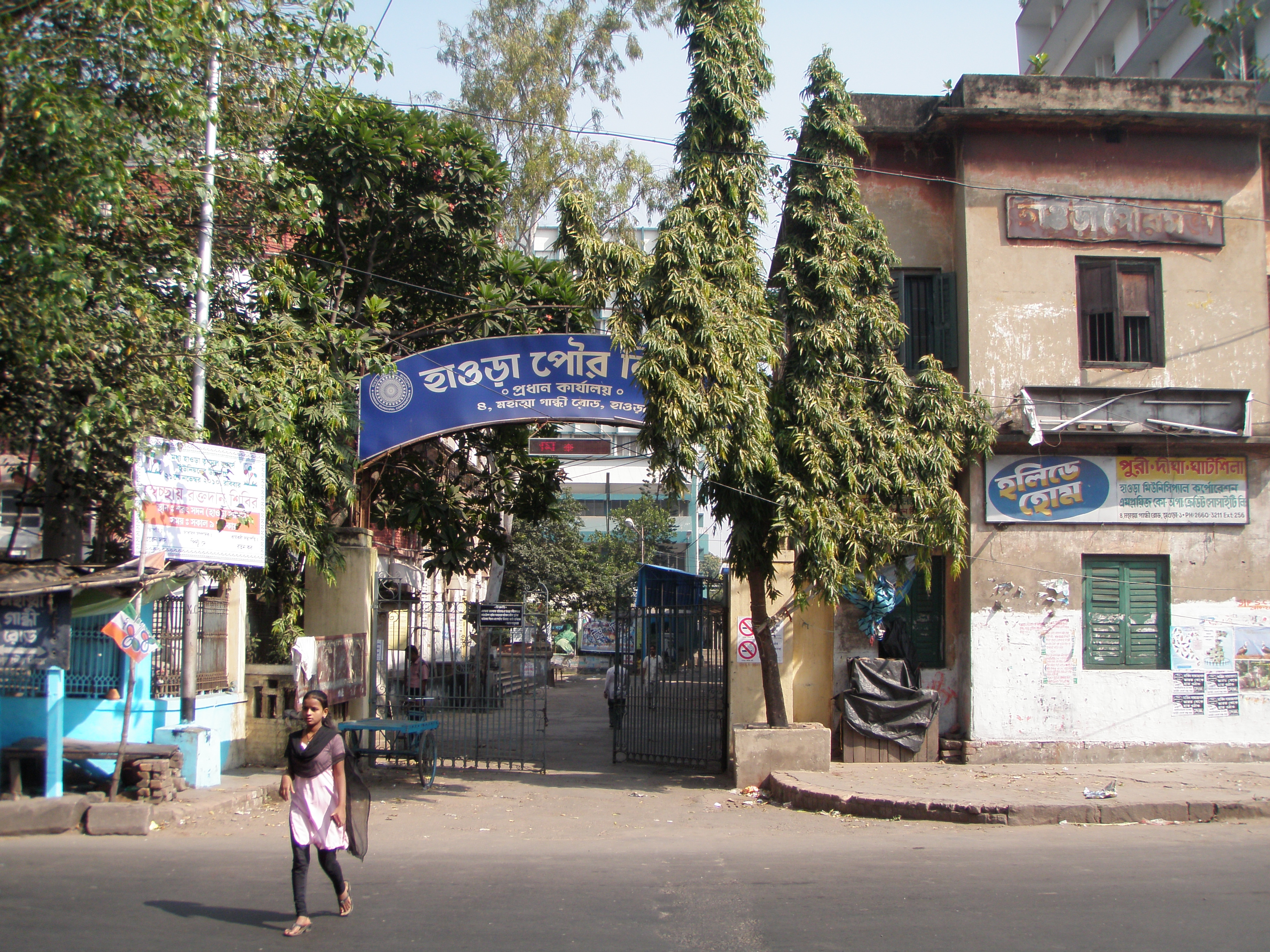
Howrah Municipal Corporation

=== Language ===
Languages of Howrah District (2011)
1. Bengali (85.0%)
2. Hindi (10.9%)
3. Urdu (2.86%)
4. Others (1.23%)

According to the 2011 census, 84.99% of the population spoke Bengali, 10.92% Hindi and 2.86% Urdu as their first language. Hindi and Urdu are mainly spoken in urban areas.

== Assembly constituencies ==
The district is divided into 16 assembly constituencies: Sankrail and Uluberia North constituencies will remain reserved for Scheduled Castes (SC) candidates. The division is represented in the Lok Sabha by the Howrah Lok Sabha constituency and Uluberia Lok Sabha constituency .

S No.	Name	Lok Sabha	MLA	2026 Winner	2024 Lead
169	Bally	Howrah	Sanjay Kumar Singh	Bharatiya Janata Party	Trinamool Congress
170	Howrah Uttar	Howrah	Umesh Rai	Bharatiya Janata Party	Trinamool Congress
171	Howrah Madhya	Howrah	Arup Roy	Trinamool Congress	Trinamool Congress
172	Shibpur	Howrah	Rudranil Ghosh	Bharatiya Janata Party	Trinamool Congress
173	Howrah Dakshin	Howrah	Nandita Chowdhury	Trinamool Congress	Trinamool Congress
174	Sankrail (SC)	Howrah	Priya Paul	Trinamool Congress	Trinamool Congress
175	Panchla	Howrah	Gulsan Mullick	Trinamool Congress	Trinamool Congress
176	Uluberia Purba	Uluberia	Ritabrata Banerjee	Independent (Note: Trinamool Congress expelled Ritabrata Banerjee from the party)	Trinamool Congress
177	Uluberia Uttar (SC)	Uluberia	Chiran Bera	Bharatiya Janata Party	Trinamool Congress
178	Uluberia Dakshin	Uluberia	Pulak Roy	Trinamool Congress	Trinamool Congress
179	Shyampur	Uluberia	Hiran Chatterjee	Bharatiya Janata Party	Trinamool Congress
180	Bagnan	Uluberia	Arunava Sen	Trinamool Congress	Trinamool Congress
181	Amta	Uluberia	Amit Samanta	Bharatiya Janata Party	Trinamool Congress
182	Udaynarayanpur	Uluberia	Samir Kumar Panja	Trinamool Congress	Trinamool Congress
183	Jagatballavpur	Sreerampur	Anupam Ghosh	Bharatiya Janata Party	Trinamool Congress
184	Domjur	Sreerampur	Tapas Maity	Trinamool Congress	Trinamool Congress

== Industries ==
Howrah district is an important industrial centre in West Bengal, India. Its industries include engineering, foundries, steel processing, forging, paints, food processing and manufacturing.

=== Selected factories and manufacturing companies ===
Selected industrial establishments in Howrah district
Company	Industry	Factory location	Official website	Reference
PRAN Foods India Pvt. Ltd.	Food processing and packaged foods	Ranihati, Amta–Ranihati Road, Howrah	PRAN Foods India	
Anupam Paints	Paints and coatings	Foundry Park, Laskarpur, Ranihati–Amta Road, Howrah	Anupam Paints	
Jindal India Limited	Steel products and metal processing	Jangalpur and Ranihati, Howrah	Jindal India	
Ramkrishna Forgings Limited	Forging and engineering components	Howrah district	Ramkrishna Forgings	

== Notable people ==
- Suniti Kumar Chatterji, Bengali linguist, educationist and litterateur. He was a recipient of the second highest civilian award in India, Padma Vibhushan.
- Narayan Debnath, Indian comics artist, writer and illustrator who created the Bengali comic strips Handa Bhonda, Bantul the Great and Nonte Phonte.
- Purnendu Pattrea, Indian poet, writer, editor, artist, illustrator, and film director,best known for his poetry collection Kathopokathan in Bengali.
- Afsar Ahmed, Bengali writer.
- Sailen Manna, Indian football player, Olympian, Padma Shri recipient.
- Laxmi Ratan Shukla, Indian cricketer and politician.
- Manoj Tiwary, Bengal and Indian cricketer and politician.
- Shreevats Goswami, Indian cricketer.
- Saurasish Lahiri, Bengal Ranji cricketer.
- Shekh Faiaz, Indian footballer.
- Dhananjay Bhattacharya, Bengali singer(especially Shyama Sangeet) and composer.
- Tulsi Chakraborty, Iconic character actor and comedian of Bengali cinema, best known for his lead role in Satyajit Ray's Parash Pathar.
- Anjana Basu, Bengali television and film actress.
- Ayaz Ahmed, Indian television actor.
- Hannan Mollah, communist,MP and was a senior leader of the All India Kisan Sabha.
- Kanailal Bhattacharyya, educator, politician and former minister of Ministry of Commerce & Industries (West Bengal).
- Sultan Ahmed, was an Indian politician and the Union Minister of State for Tourism in the Manmohan Singh government.
- Sajda Ahmed, MP of Lok Sabha and a social worker.
- Mohammed Amin, MP of Rajya Sabha.
- Arup Roy, Indian politician. He was a cabinet Minister in Charge of Co-operations department, of Government of West Bengal.
- Mahendranath Ray, Indian lawyer, independence activist, social worker, mathematician, educationist and a politician.
- Manoranjan Chakraborty, devoted freedom fighter born in Tajnagar who actively participated in the Civil Disobedience Movement.
- Azangachhi Shaheb, Bengali 19th Sufi saint who founded the Haqqani Anjuman.

== See also ==
- 2016 Dhulagarh riots
