= Left Front =

Left Front may refer to:

== Politics ==
=== Europe ===
- Left Front (Czechoslovakia) (Czech: Levá fronta), an organization of left-wing intellectuals founded in 1929
- Left Front (France) (French: Front de gauche), a French electoral alliance created for the 2009 European elections
- Left Front (Russia) (Russian: Левый Фронт), a group in Russia that is critical of Vladimir Putin
- Left Front (Catalonia) (Catalan: Front d'Esquerres), an electoral alliance planned ahead of the 1977 Spanish general election

=== India ===
==== West Bengal ====
- Left Front (West Bengal) (Bengali: বামফ্রন্ট Bamfrônṭ), an alliance of left-wing parties in the Indian state of West Bengal
- United Left Election Committee, an electoral alliance in West Bengal, India, formed ahead of the 1957 West Bengal Legislative Assembly election
- United Left Front (1957), an electoral alliance formed ahead of the 1957 West Bengal Legislative Assembly Election
- United Left Front (1962), an electoral alliance formed ahead of the 1962 West Bengal Legislative Assembly Election
- United Left Front (1967), an electoral alliance formed ahead of the 1967 West Bengal Legislative Assembly Election
- People's United Left Front, an electoral alliance in West Bengal, India, formed in December 1966, ahead of the 1967 West Bengal Legislative Assembly election

==== Others ====
- Left Front (Tripura), a political alliance in the Indian state of Tripura
- Left Democratic Manch, a political alliance in the Indian state of Assam
- Left Democratic Front (Kerala), a coalition of left-wing political parties in the state of Kerala, India
- Left Democratic Front (Maharashtra), a coalition of left-wing political parties in the state of Maharashtra, India
- Left Democratic Front (Tamil Nadu), a coalition of left-wing political parties in the state of Tamil Nadu, India
- Republican Left Democratic Front, a coalition of political parties in the Indian state of Maharashtra formed before the Maharashtra state assembly elections, 2009

== Periodicals ==
- LEF (journal) (Russian: ЛЕФ), later called New LEF (Russian: Novyi LEF)
- Left Front (magazine) (1930–1934/5), an American magazine published by the Chicago chapter of the John Reed Club

== See also ==
- Left Democratic Front (disambiguation)
- Left Revolutionary Front (disambiguation)
- United Left Front (disambiguation)
