= United Left Front =

United Left Front may refer to:

== India ==
- United Left Front (1957), an electoral alliance formed ahead of the 1957 West Bengal Legislative Assembly Election
- United Left Election Committee, electoral alliance formed ahead of the 1957 West Bengal Legislative Assembly Election
- United Left Front (1962), an electoral alliance formed ahead of the 1962 West Bengal Legislative Assembly Election
- United Left Front (1967), an electoral alliance formed ahead of the 1967 West Bengal Legislative Assembly Election
  - People's United Left Front, formed ahead of 1967 West Bengal Legislative assembly elections and post-elections merged with United Left Front (1967)

== Nepal ==
- The United Left Front (Nepal) (1990), formed to combat autocracy in the country and took part in the Jana Andolan
- The United Left Front (Nepal) (2002), formed to combat the resurgency of autocracy under King Gyanendra

== See also ==
- Left Front (disambiguation)
- Left Democratic Front (disambiguation)
