= Left Democratic Front (disambiguation) =

- Left Democratic Front is a political alliance in Kerala, India.

Left Democratic Front may also refer to:

- Left Democratic Front (Maharashtra), India
- Left Democratic Front (Tamil Nadu), India
- Left and Secular Democratic Front (Manipur), India
- Left Democratic Manch (Assam, India)
- Democratic Left Front (South Africa)
- Left Democratic Front (Pakistan)
- Left of Catalonia–Democratic Electoral Front (Spain)
- Republican Left Democratic Front (Maharashtra, India)

== See also ==
- Democratic Left (disambiguation)
- Left Democrats (disambiguation)
- Left Front (disambiguation)
- United Left Front (disambiguation)
- Progressive Democratic Front (disambiguation)
