= Republican Party of India (disambiguation) =

The Republican Party of India was a political party in India.

Republican Party of India may also refer to these splinters:

- Republican Party of India (Athawale), since 1999, led by Ramdas Athawale
- Republican Party of India (Democratic) or RP(D), 2004–2015 in Maharashtra, led by T. M. Kamble
- Republican Party of India (Gavai), in Maharashtra, led by R. S. Gavai
- Republican Party of India (Kamble), in Maharashtra, founded by B. C. Kamble
- Republican Party of India (Khobragade), 1977–2004, founded by B. D. Khobragade
- Republican Party of India (Kawade) or Peoples Republican Party in Maharashtra, led by Jogendra Kawade
- Republican Party of India (United), a coalition of factions of the Republican Party of India

== See also ==
- Republican Party (disambiguation)
