= Republican Party of India (United) =

Political party in India

The Republican Party of India (United), or RPI(U) is a coalition of many factions of the Republican Party of India (RPI). It was formed as an electoral alliance ahead of the 2009 Maharashtra Legislative Assembly election. The party was initially led by Rajendra Gavai, Jogendra Kawade, T.M. Kamble, and others but Gavai's faction later split from the united party. The group has since suffered internal strife similar to the disputes prior to the coalition's creation. Several parties still claim to be the real RPI.

The RPI(U) was part of the Republican Left Democratic Front coalition in Maharashtra ahead of the state's 2009 election.

== Membership ==
The RPI(U) currently includes:

- Peoples Republican Party, led by Jogendra Kawade
- Republican Party of India of T. M. Kamble
- Republican Party of India of B. C. Kamble
- Republican Party of India of Rajabhau Khobragade
- Republican Party of India (Dhale)
- Republican Party of India (Mogha)
- Republican Party of India (Talwatkar)
- Republican Party of India (Sivaraj)
- Indian Republican Party (Dalit Panther) of Namdeo Dhasal
- Bahujan Mahasangh of Makhram Pawar
