= Sudha Roy =

Indian politician

Sudha Roy (1914–1987) was an Indian communist trade unionist and politician. She was a prominent leader of the Bengal Labour Party, the Bolshevik Party of India and later joined the Communist Party of India. She was one of the most prominent female leaders of the Bengali left.

== Youth ==
Roy was born in 1914 into a Kayastha landlord family in Faridpur. She joined labour movement in the 1930s, having been introduced to labour politics by her brother Sisir Roy during her student days. Alongside her brother, she became a key leader of the Bengal Labour Party when it was founded in 1933.

== Bolshevik Party joins CPI ==
The Bolshevik Party joined the Communist Party in early 1936, and Sudha Roy also joined the CPI. She was probably the second woman to join the illegal CPI in Bengal. The first one was Latika Sen. Latika became a martyr in police firing on 27 April 1949.

Bolshevik Party once again reconstituted and re-emerged as a party. That was in 1939 in Tripuri Congress on the question of Subhash Bose. The leaders of Bolshevik Party such as Niharendu Dutt, Bishwanath Dubey, Sisir Roy and others felt that the CPI should have supported Bose in his forma- tion of Forward Bloc. They also felt that CPI was following a policy of class collabora- tion in the name of national united front. Sudha Roy also attended the Tripuri Con- gress as a Communist delegate and took part in important CPI meetings. She too left CPI along with others to join the Bolshevik Party.

In 1941, she gave up her job for a time to work in the BLP.

== Labour organiser ==
She worked as mathematics teacher at Kamala Girls School in south Calcutta between 1932 and 1958. At the time she was a well-known labour leader. Roy, nicknamed Bahinji ('Honoured sister') by dock workers, would pass the Kidderpore dock daily in the afternoon for union tasks.

== Women's movement ==
Roy joined the women's movement in 1943, being active in the All India Women's Conference. Roy served as vice chair of the National Federation of Indian Women between 1954 and 1982.

== Electoral politics ==
Sudha Roy was the sole candidate of the BPI in the 1951–1952 parliamentary election. She stood in Barrackpore constituency and obtained 25,792 votes (16.2% of vote in the constituency).

She was jailed in 1954.

Roy contested the Fort constituency in the 1957 West Bengal Legislative Assembly election. She finished in fourth place, with 9.75% of the votes.

== In UTUC ==
In 1958 Sudha Roy's union, the Dock Mazdoor Union, underwent a split. Sisir Roy, Sudha Roy and Buthnath De were pitted against Bishwanath Dubey. Whilst Roy's group constituted the majority faction, the split significantly weakened the union.

Sisir Roy died in 1960, and Sudha Roy succeeded him in the post as general secretary of the United Trade Union Congress.

== Joining CPI ==
At the 1965 BPI party conference Sudha Roy called for a merger between BPI and CPI. The conference rejected a merger and Sudha Roy and her followers left BPI to join CPI. After shifting to CPI, she joined the All India Trade Union Congress.

She extended firm and active support to Bangladesh liberation struggle in the 1970s.

Roy chaired the State Social Welfare Board between 1969 and 1973. Roy founded the Mahila Sanskritik Saimmelan ('Women's Cultural Conference').

Sudha Roy died on 7 June 1987, after prolonged illness.
