= Sisir Roy =

Indian politician (1912–1960)

Sisir Roy (1912–1960) (Bengali: শিশির রায়) was an Indian communist politician and trade unionist. He served as general secretary of the Bolshevik Party of India and the United Trade Union Congress, and was active in organizing dock workers in Calcutta.

== Labour Party ==
Roy's father worked as a technical officer at Tata Iron & Steel Co. Roy attracted with the revolutionary politics during his student days, and he was jailed. After being released from prison he began organizing labour unions. In 1933 he founded the Calcutta Port Dock Workers Union and became its general secretary. In the same year he took part in founding the Bengal Labour Party. The nucleus of the Bengal Labour Party became members of the Communist Party of India. Roy took part in events organized by the League Against Gandhism. He played a leading role in the dock workers strike of 1934.

== Bolshevik Party leader ==
In 1939 Roy and the other Bengal Labour Party leaders broke with CPI and founded the Bolshevik Party of India. Around the time of the independence of India in 1947, Roy had become general secretary of BPI. During this period the trade unions led by BPI joined the United Trade Union Congress and Roy became the general secretary of UTUC. He represented the union side in the Calcutta Dock Labour Board.

== Death and aftermath ==
Roy died in 1960. Nepal Bhattacharya became the new general secretary of BPI after Roy's death. His sister, Sudha Roy, took over his post as UTUC general secretary.
