= Left Democrats =

Left Democrats can mean:

- Democrats of the Left (Democratici di Sinistra) - a former political party in Italy
- Left Democrats (Vänsterdemokraterna) - a former political party in Sweden
- Left and Democrats (Lewica i Demokraci) - a former political alliance in Poland
- LeftDem
- Left Democratic Manch, Assam

== See also ==
- Left Democratic Front (disambiguation)
- Democratic Left (disambiguation)
