= Bolshevik Party of India =

- Founder: N. Dutta Mazumder
- Founded: 1939 (87 years ago)
- Headquarters: Nagpur
- Ideology: Communism; Marxism–Leninism
- National affiliation: Left Front

The Bolshevik Party of India (abbreviated BPI) is an Indian political party in India. The party was founded in 1939. The party had a certain role in the trade union movement in West Bengal and was briefly represented in the state government in 1969. In later years the party has played a negligible role in Indian politics.

== Background ==
BPI traces its roots to the Bengal Labour Party, founded in 1933 and led by Niharendu Dutt Mazumdar. Prominent leaders of the Bengal Labour Party included Sisir Roy, Sudha Roy, Bishwanath Dubey, Kamal Sarkar, Nandalal Bose and Promode Sen.

As of 1930s the Bengal Labour Party led various trade unions, such as

- Calcutta Port and Dock Workers Union
- Various unions of Jute mill workers in Titagarh, Barrackpore, Jagatdal, Naihati, Hajinagar, Kankinara, Shyamnagar, Gouripore, etc.
- All Bengal Iron and Steel Workers Union, Entally
- Metal and Engineering Workers Union, Garden Reach
- All Bengal Chemical Workers Union
- East India Railway Workers' Union, Liluah
- Saxby and Farmer Company Workers' Union
- Bengal Chemical and Pharmaceutical Workers' Union
- Hukumchand Iron and Steel Workers, Ballyganj
- Bird and Company Workers Union
- Water Transport Workers Union
- Scavengers Union

The leaders of the Bengal Labour Party joined the Communist Party of India in the mid-1930s, but maintained the Labour Party as an open organisation. However, they disagreed with the role of CPI around the Tripuri session of the Indian National Congress and criticised the CPI for not siding with the All India Forward Bloc when Netaji Subhash Chandra Bose broke with the Congress. These Bengal Labour Party leaders, such as N. Dutt Mazumdar, Sisir Roy (founding general secretary of the Calcutta Port Dock Workers Union), Biswanath Dubey and Ajit Roy founded BPI in 1939. The Bolshevik Party of India was an underground Marxist–Leninist organisation, maintaining the Labour Party as its front organisation. In the discourse of the nascent BPI, CPI had reduced the Marxist–Leninist theory of united front to a "base theory of class-collaboration with the reactionary Gandhian leadership of the bourgeois Congress". BPI called on CPI cadres to revolt against their party leadership. N. Dutta Mazumdar was the founding general secretary of BPI.

== Second World War ==
When the Second World War broke out, BPI characterised the war as 'imperialist' and called for a revolutionary mass movement against British rule in India. However, with the onset of war between Germany and the Soviet Union the party did a U-turn and aligned with the CPI position and called for anti-fascist unity and support to the British war effort.

However, N. Dutta Mazumdar did not agree with this position and supported the Quit India movement. The Labour Party was banned. He was detained for three years and joined the Indian National Congress and dissolved the Labour Party upon his release. On the other hand Nirmal Sen and some twenty key party member joined CPI in 1943. A group led by Promode Sen, student leader of BPI, joined the Indian National Congress in 1944.

In early 1944 the BPI politburo dissolved the Bengal Committee of the party and formed a 4-member secretariat for the province consisting of Barada Mukutmoni, Mani Bishnu Chaudhuri, Amar Naskar and Dinanath Gupta.

== Partition and independence ==
Around the time of Indian independence Sisir Roy was the general secretary of BPI. BPI echoed other Indian left-wing formations in labelling the Partition of India as treason. The party called for a United States of India, with linguistic states and tribal autonomy. It advocated breaking with the Commonwealth and instead orient India toward trade pacts with the Soviet Union, China and the people's democracies. The headquarter of the party was based in Ballygunj, Calcutta.

BPI joined Sarat Chandra Bose's United Socialist Organisation of India. BPI, then recognised as a national party by the Election Commission of India, fielded a single candidate (Sudha Roy, the sister of Sisir Roy, in Barrackpore) in the 1951–1952 parliamentary election. Roy obtained 25,792 votes (16.2% of vote in the constituency). The party contested 8 seats in the 1952 West Bengal Legislative Assembly election. Together they obtained 20,117 votes (0.27% of the state-wide vote). In the 1952 Madhya Pradesh Legislative Assembly election BPI fielded 1 candidate, Waman Jangloe Bhalekar in Nagpur IV. Bhalekar obtained 1,077 votes (1.22% of the a votes in the constituency).

In the 1950s the Anandi Mukherji-led faction of the Forward Communist Party merged into BPI, bringing into BPI the Bengal, Bihar and Uttar Pradesh branches of the Forward Communist Party. In June 1954 the Workers and Peasants League of Nepal Bhattacharya merged with the party.

By the mid-1950s BPI claimed to have around 3,000 members. Most lived in West Bengal, but the party was also active in Assam, Madhya Pradesh, Bihar, Bombay and Uttar Pradesh.

The trade unions led by BPI joined the United Trade Union Congress. Sisir Roy became the general secretary of UTUC.

== In alliances ==
The party joined the SUCI-led United Left Front ahead of the 1957 West Bengal Legislative Assembly election. Amongst the BPI candidates, contesting as independents, was Barada Mukutmoni in Titagarh (fourth place, 6.92%), Nepal Bhattacharya in Ekbalpore (fourth place, 9.60%) and Sudha Roy in Fort (fourth place, 9.75%).

In 1957 a split occurred between Sisir Roy, the party general secretary, and Bishwanath Dubey, a prominent trade union leader of the party. Roy accused Dubey of acting in cahoots with US imperialist interests. The split broke the Dock Mazdoor Union into two, and also provoked a split in UTUC. Dubey and his followers constituted a faction of their own, which in 1959 joined the Tagore faction of the Revolutionary Communist Party of India. After Dubey was forced to leave the party, the BPI trade union work was significantly weakened. In 1963 Dubey founded a new, rival West Bengal Dock Mazdoor Union.

The party was part of the CPI-led United Left Front during the 1962 West Bengal Legislative Assembly election. Amongst the BPI candidates, contesting as independents, where Sita Seth in Bhatpara (fourth place, 0.92%), Barada Mukutmoni in Deganga (second place, 32.83%) and Nepal Bhattacharya (second place, 24.41%).

== Bhattacharya era ==
Sisir Roy died in 1960. Nepal Bhattacharya became the new general secretary of BPI. Sudha Roy replaced Sisir Roy as UTUC general secretary. At the 1965 party conference Sudha Roy called for a merger between BPI and CPI. The conference rejected a merger and Sudha Roy and her followers left BPI to join CPI.

== United Front ==
Ahead of the 1967 West Bengal Legislative Assembly election BPI joined the CPI-led People's United Left Front. BPI candidates, contesting on CPI tickets, included Barada Mukutmoni in Naihati (third place, 13.10%), Sita Seth in Bhatpara (fourth place, 1.99%) and Nepal Bhattacharya in Bijpur (third place, 18.56%). Ahead the election the People's United Left Front joined the United Front which formed a state government.

In March 1969 Barada Mukutmoni was named Minister of Tourism in the second United Front government of West Bengal.

== Split ==
A split occurred in BPI in the wake of Mukutmoni joining the state government. To become a minister Mukutmoni had to resign from his post as secretary of the West Bengal State Committee of BPI, which he did. But when the State Committee met on 14 March 1969 Mukutmoni's candidate for new secretary was defeated in a vote. Mukutmoni refused to hand over the secretary post to the secretary-elect Sita Seth and in July 1969 the Central Committee of BPI declared expelled Mukutmoni and his followers from the party. In response Mukutmoni formed a Central Committee of his own at a meeting in Kalyani, Nadia District in July 1969, with three expelled West Bengal State Committee members: Sita Kanta Bhattacharjee, Jyotish Dutt and Santosh Mukherjee. The two factions clashed over control of the party headquarters on Central Avenue.

After the fall of the United Front cabinet and ahead of the 1971 West Bengal Legislative Assembly election the BPI (Nepal Bhattacharya group) joined the CPI(M)-led United Left Front whilst the BPI (Barada Mukutmoni) joined the CPI-led United Left Democratic Front. When CPI later withdrew from front politics in West Bengal, the Mukutmoni faction aligned with the Janata Party. The Mukutmoni faction later merged into the All India Communist Party.

== Current status ==
For many years, BPI went into decay and was isolated from other left forces.

The party contested the 1991 elections as a partner of the SUCI-led electoral front.

In later years there were efforts to revive the party. As of 2015 present BPI is headquartered in Nagpur. As of 2011 the party claimed having state committees in Delhi, Maharashtra, Uttar Pradesh, West Bengal, Bihar and Jharkhand. As of 2014 Shashikant Waikar was the general secretary of the party and Chitta Nath the secretary of its West Bengal Committee. As of 2014 the party had joined the West Bengal Left Front.
