= Republican Left =

Republican Left can refer to different political parties and alliances:

- Republican Left (Italy)
- Republican Left (Spain)
- Republican Left (Spain, 1977)
- Republican Left of Catalonia
  - Republican Left of Catalonia–Catalonia Yes
  - Republican Left of Catalonia–Sovereigntists
  - Republican Left of the Valencian Country
- Republican Left Democratic Front (Maharashtra, India)
- Rally of Left Republicans (France)
