= Ashok Laxmanrao Kukade =

Indian physician and author

Ashok Laxmanrao Kukade is an Indian surgeon and author, who was awarded Padma Bhushan (2019), India's third-highest civilian award for his work in the medical field. He is the co-founder of Vivekanand Hospital and Research Center along with Dr.Firke, Dr.Alurkar in Latur, Maharashtra.

== Publications ==
- Katha Ek Dhyeysadhnechi (कथा एका ध्येयसाधनेची) (in Marathi). Snehal Prakashan.
