= Democratic Left Movement =

Democratic Left Movement may refer to:

- Democratic Left Movement (Lebanon)
- Democratic Left Movement (Peru)

== See also ==
- Democratic Left (disambiguation)
