= Satyashodhak Communist Party =

- Secretary: Sharad Patil
- Founded: 1978
- Ideology: Marxism; Phule thought Ambedkarism
- Alliance: Left Democratic Front (Maharashtra)

The Satyashodhak Communist Party is a political party in the state of Maharashtra, India. The party was founded by Comrade Sharad Patil, who as of 2009 still serves as its General Secretary. The party bases its political philosophy on the thinking of Karl Marx, B. R. Ambedkar and Jyotirao Phule.

Patil had been an organizer of the Communist Party of India (Marxist) in the Dhule district. He developed his ideological thesis of 'Marxism-Phule-Ambedkarism', and in 1978 he broke with the CPI(M) and founded the Satyashodhak Communist Party. The party was named after Phule's Satyashodhak Samaj. Patil called for the building of an alliance between Dalits and Other Backward Castes, especially amongst the peasantry. The main base of the movement at the time of its foundation was limited to two Adivasi talukas in Dhule district, but Patil's rhetoric won an audience across the state and played an influential formulating a popular understanding of class-caste relations in rural areas. He relied heavily on motifs from classical Indian literature during speaking tours of rural areas.

In the early 1980s, the party added 'ending women's slavery' to its programme for Democratic Revolution.

Ahead of the April 2009 Lok Sabha election, the party joined the CPI(M)-led Left Democratic Front.

In August 2009, in the run-up to the Maharashtra Legislative Assembly election, the party took part in founding the Republican Left Democratic Front popularly known as RIDALOS, a broad coalition of political parties in Maharashtra.
