= Usoi =

Usoi can refer to:

- Usoi, Bulgaria, a village that was merged with Elena in 1971
- Usoi Dam, a natural landslide dam on the Murghab River in Tajikistan
- Usoi language, a Bodo language spoken in Bangladesh
- USOI, the United Socialist Organisation of India, a former political alliance in India
