= 1957 West Bengal Legislative Assembly election =

Assembly Election of West Bengal, India

1957 West Bengal state assembly election
- May 8, 1957

All 252 seats in the West Bengal state assembly 127 seats needed for a majority
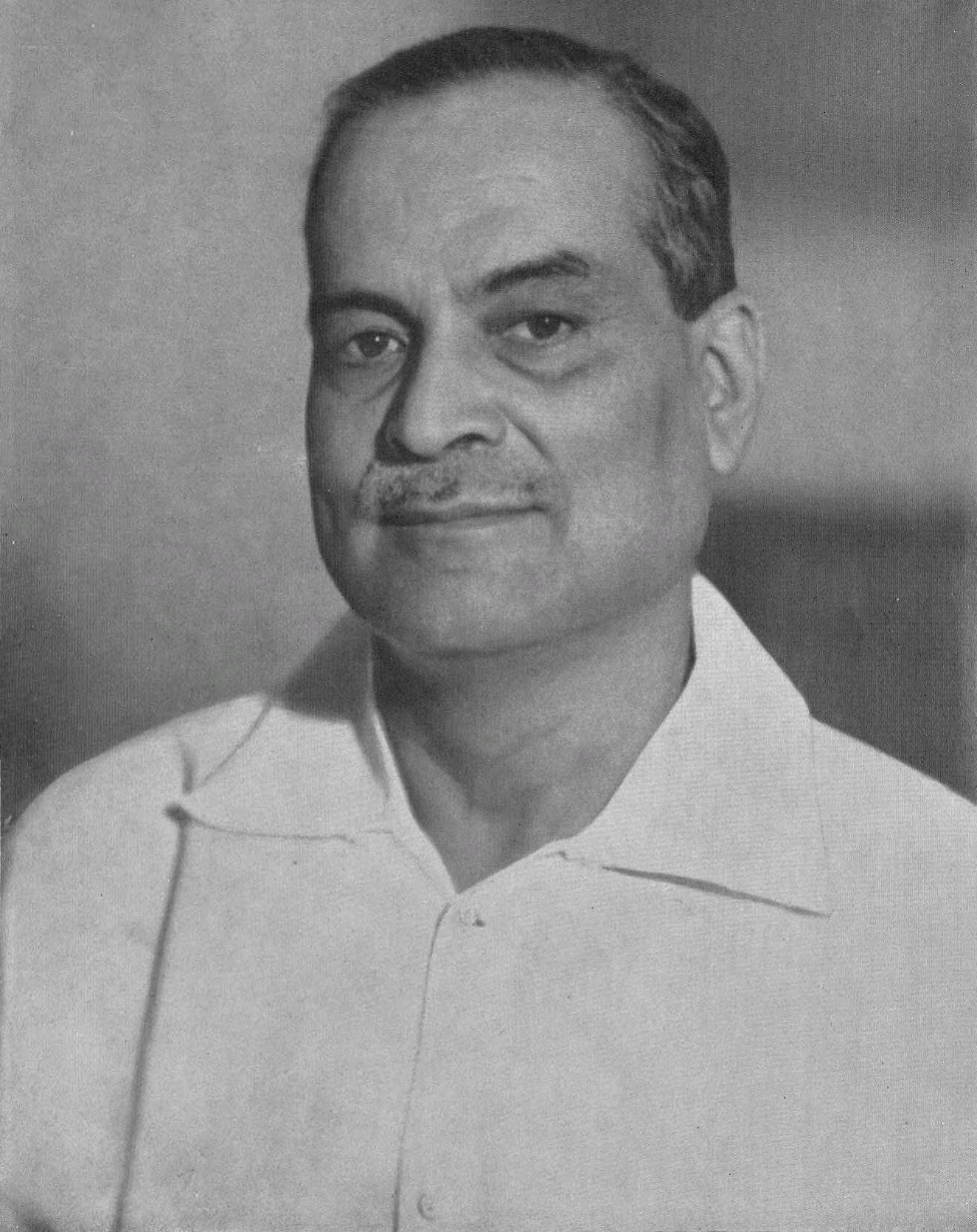

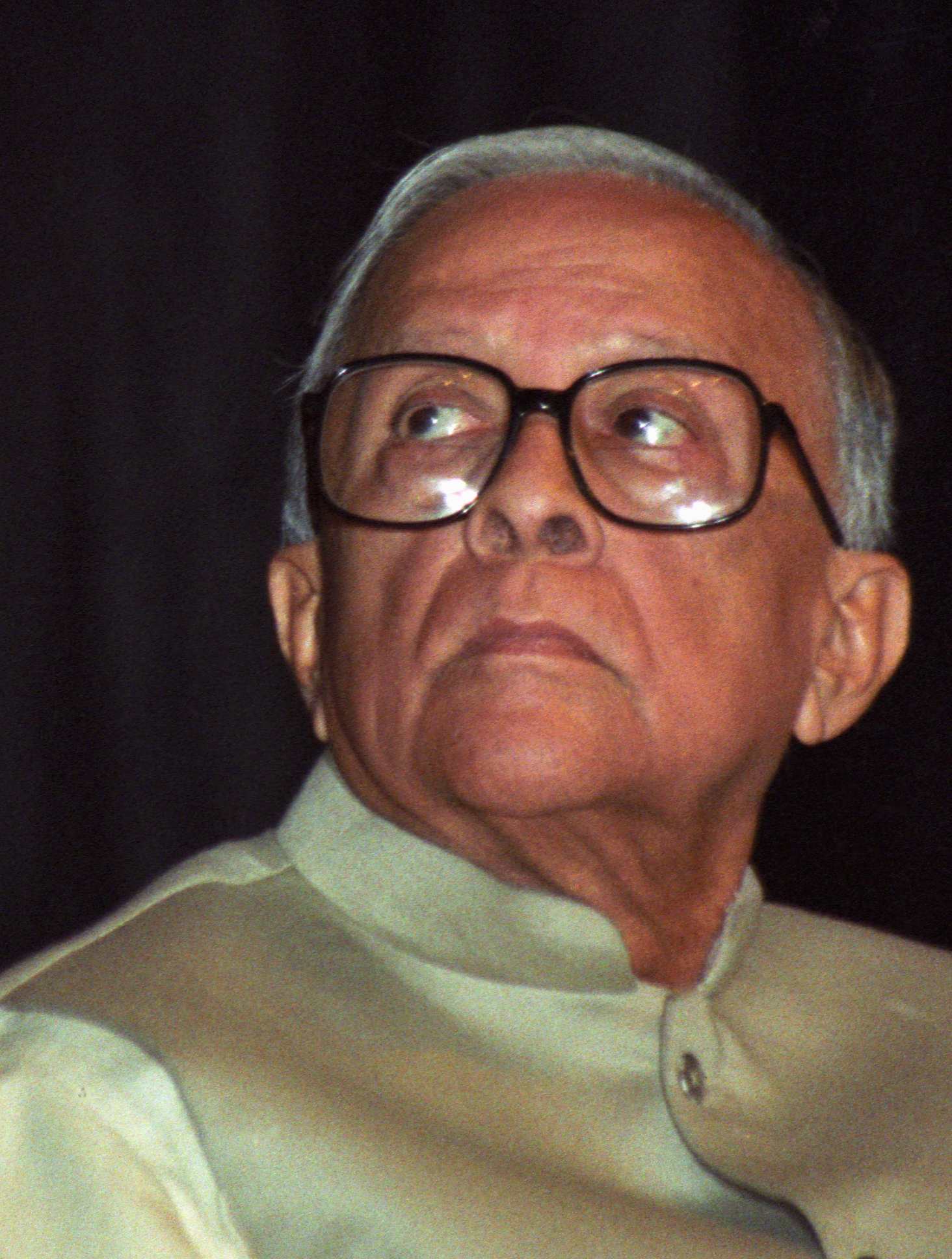
	First party	Second party
Leader	Bidhan Chandra Roy	Jyoti Basu
Party	INC	CPI
Alliance		ULEC
Leader since	1952	1952
Leader's seat	Bowbazar	Baranagar
Last election	38.8%, 150 seats	10.8%, 28 seats
Seats won	152	46
Seat change	▲2	▲18
Popular vote	4,830,992	1,865,106
Percentage	46.1%	17.8%
Swing	▲7.3 pp	▲7 pp
- Structure of the West Bengal Legislative Assembly after the election
Chief Minister before election
Bidhan Chandra Roy
INC
Chief Minister after election
Bidhan Chandra Roy
INC

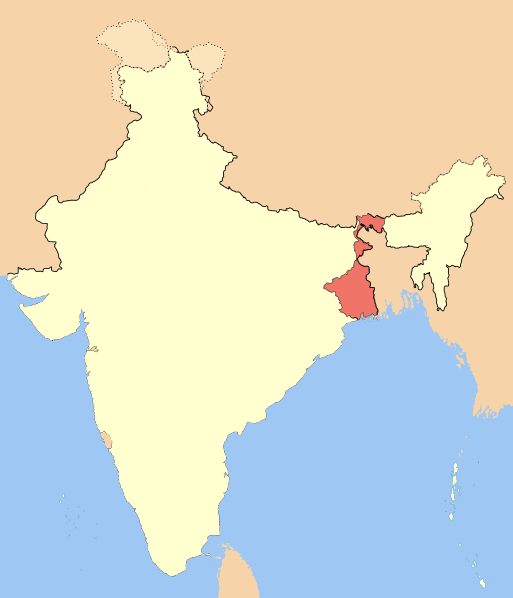
West Bengal, India

The West Bengal state assembly election of 1957 was part of a series of state assembly elections in 1957.

== State Reorganization ==
On 1 November 1956, under States Reorganisation Act, 1956, a portion of the Purnea district east of the river Mahananda and the Purulia sub-district of the Manbhum district in the south (except Char Thana) were transferred from Bihar to West Bengal. Thus, assembly constituencies in West Bengal increased from 187 (238 seats) to 195 (252 seats) during 1957 assembly elections.

== Alliances ==
On the political left two alliances had emerged; the United Left Election Committee (an alliance between CPI, PSP, AIFB, MFB and RSP) and the United Left Front (comprising the SUC, the BPI, the RPI and the Democratic Vanguard). A third alliance was the United Democratic People's Front, consisting of BJS, Hindu Mahasabha and RCPI.

== Results ==
=== Alliance wise result ===
The election was won by the Indian National Congress, who got a majority of its own in the assembly. The communists became the largest opposition party.

ULFC	SEATS	ULF	SEATS	INC+	SEATS	UDPF	SEATS	OTHERS	SEATS
CPI	46	SUCI	0	INC	152	BJS	0	IND	25
PSP	21	BPI	0			ABHM	0		
AIFB	8	Republican Party				RCPI			
MFB		DV							
RSP									
TOTAL (1957)	75	TOTAL (1957)	0	TOTAL (1957)	152	TOTAL (1957)	0	TOTAL (1957)	0
TOTAL (1952)	39	TOTAL (1952)	2	TOTAL (1952)	150	TOTAL (1952)	13	TOTAL (1952)	34

Party/Alliance	Own	%
Indian National Congress	152	46.14%
United Left Election Committee	80	33.6%
United Left Front (1957)	2	2.45%
United Democratic People's Front	0	3.44%

Summary of results of the 1957 West Bengal Legislative Assembly election
Party	No. of candidates	No. of elected	No. of votes	%
Indian National Congress	251	152	4,830,992	46.14%
Communist Party of India	103	46	1,865,106	17.81%
Praja Socialist Party	67	21	1,031,392	9.85%
Forward Bloc	26	8	425,318	4.06%
Akhil Bharatiya Hindu Mahasabha	37	0	225,126	2.15%
Bharatiya Jana Sangh	33	0	102,477	0.98%
Independents	418	25	1,989,392	19.00%
Total:	935	252	10,469,803	

== Elected members ==
Constituency	Reserved for (SC/ST/None)	Member	Party
Kalimpong	None	Narbahadur Gurung	Independent
Darjeeling	None	Deo Prakash Rai	Independent
Jore Bungalow	None	Bhadra Bahadur Hamal	Communist Party of India
Siliguri	ST	Satyendra Narayan Mazumdar	Communist Party of India
Siliguri	ST	T. Wangdi	Indian National Congress
Jalpaiguri	SC	Sarojendra Deb Raikut	Indian National Congress
Jalpaiguri	SC	Khagendra Nath Das Gupta	Indian National Congress
Mal	ST	Mangru Bhagat	Communist Party of India
Mal	ST	Budhu Bhagat	Indian National Congress
Mainaguri	None	Jaineswar Roy	Indian National Congress
Falakata	None	Jagadananda Roy	Praja Socialist Party
Kalchini	ST	Debendra Nath Brahma Mandal	Indian National Congress
Kalchini	ST	Anima Hoare	Indian National Congress
Alipur Duars	None	Pijush Kanti Mukherjee	Indian National Congress
Tufanganj	None	Jatindra Nath Sinha Sarker	Indian National Congress
Cooch Behar	SC	Maziruddin Ahmed	Indian National Congress
Cooch Behar	SC	Satish Chandra Roy Singha	Indian National Congress
Dinhata	SC	Bhawani Prasanna Talukdar	Indian National Congress
Dinhata	SC	Umesh Chandra Mandal	Indian National Congress
Mathabhanga	None	Sarada Prasad Pramanik	Indian National Congress
Mekliganj	None	Satyendra Prasanna Chatterjee	Indian National Congress
Balurghat	ST	Mardi Hakai	Indian National Congress
Balurghat	ST	Dhirendra Nath Banerjee	Independent
Gangarampur	ST	Lakshan Chandra Hasda	Indian National Congress
Gangarampur	ST	Satindra Nath Basu	Indian National Congress
Raiganj	SC	Hazi Badiruddin Ahmmad	Indian National Congress
Raiganj	SC	Syama Prasad Barman	Indian National Congress
Itahar	None	Basanta Lal Chatterjee	Communist Party of India
Chopra	None	Mahammad Affaque Choudhury	Indian National Congress
Goalpokhar	None	Muzzafar Hussain	Indian National Congress
Karandighi	None	Phanis Chandra Sinha	Indian National Congress
Kharba	None	Golam Yazdani	Independent
Harischandrapur	None	Elias Razi	Independent
Ratua	SC	Sourindra Mohan Misra	Indian National Congress
Ratua	SC	Dhaneswar Saha	Indian National Congress
Malda	ST	Nikunja Behari Gupta	Indian National Congress
Malda	ST	Matla Murmu	Indian National Congress
Englishbazar	None	Santi Gopal Sen	Indian National Congress
Sujapur	None	Monoranjan Misra	Independent
Kaliachak	None	Mahibur Rahman Choudhury	Indian National Congress
Farakka	None	Mahammad Giasuddin	Indian National Congress
Suti	None	Lutfal Hoque	Indian National Congress
Jangirpur	SC	Shyamapada Bhattacharjee	Indian National Congress
Jangirpur	SC	Kuber Chand Haldar	Indian National Congress
Murshidabad	None	Durgapada Sinha	Indian National Congress
Lalgola	None	Syed Kazem Ali Meerza	Indian National Congress
Bhagabangola	None	Hafizur Rehman Kazi	Indian National Congress
Raninagar	None	Badrudduja Syed	Independent
Jalangi	None	Golam Soleman	Indian National Congress
Hariharpara	None	Hazi A. Hameed	Indian National Congress
Berhampore	None	Bejoy Kumar Ghosh	Indian National Congress
Naoda	None	Mohammed Israil	Indian National Congress
Beldanga	None	Parimal Ghosh	Indian National Congress
Bharatpur	None	Goalbadan Trivedi	Indian National Congress
Kandi	SC	Sudhir Mondal	Indian National Congress
Kandi	SC	Bimal Chandra Sinha	Indian National Congress
Nalhati	SC	Mohammad Yeakub Hossain	Indian National Congress
Nalhati	SC	Sisir Kumar Saha	Indian National Congress
Rampurhat	SC	Gobardhan Das	Communist Party of India
Rampurhat	SC	Durgapada Das	Independent
Suri	ST	Turku Hansda	Communist Party of India
Suri	ST	Mihirlal Chatterji	Praja Socialist Party
Rajnagar	SC	Nishapati Majhi	Indian National Congress
Rajnagar	SC	Khagendranath Bandopadhyay	Indian National Congress
Bolpur	None	Amarendra Nath Sarkar	Indian National Congress
Labhpur	None	Radhanath Chattoraj	Communist Party of India
Ketugram	SC	Sankar Dass	Indian National Congress
Ketugram	SC	Abdus Sattar	Indian National Congress
Katwa	None	Tarapada Chaudhuri	Indian National Congress
Purbasthali	None	Bimalananda Taratirtha	Indian National Congress
Monteswar	None	Bhakta Chandra Roy	Independent
Kalna	ST	Hare Krishna Konar	Communist Party of India
Kalna	ST	Jamadar Majhi	Communist Party of India
Raina	SC	Dasorathi Tah	Praja Socialist Party
Raina	SC	Gobardhan Pakray	Praja Socialist Party
Burdwan	None	Benoy Krishna Chowdhury	Communist Party of India
Galsi	SC	Fakir Chandra Roy	Independent
Galsi	SC	Pramatha Nath Dhibar	Forward Bloc
Ausgram	None	Kanailal Das	Indian National Congress
Bhatar	None	Abhalata Kundu	Indian National Congress
Ondal	SC	Dhawajadhari Mondal	Indian National Congress
Ondal	SC	Ananda Gopal Mukhopadhya	Indian National Congress
Jamuria	SC	Amarendra Mondal	Praja Socialist Party
Jamuria	SC	Baidya Nath Mondal	Indian National Congress
Kulti	None	Benarashi Prosad Jha	Praja Socialist Party
Hirapur	None	Taher Hossain	Independent
Asansol	None	Shib Das Ghatak	Indian National Congress
Raghunathpur	SC	Shankar Narayan Singha Deo	Indian National Congress
Raghunathpur	SC	Nepal Bouri	Indian National Congress
Jhalda	None	Debendra Nath Mahato	Indian National Congress
Arsa	None	Sagar Chandra Mahato	Independent
Purulia	SC	Nakul Chandra Sahis	Independent
Purulia	SC	Labanya Prava Ghosh	Independent
Balarampur	None	Bhim Chandra Mahato	Independent
Manbazar	ST	Chaitan Majhi	Independent
Manbazar	ST	Satya Kinkar Mahato	Independent
Kashipur	ST	Ledu Majhi	Independent
Kashipur	ST	Budhan Majhi	Indian National Congress
Bankura	SC	Sihsuram Mandal	Indian National Congress
Bankura	SC	Anath Bandhu Roy	Indian National Congress
Chhatna	ST	Dhirendra Nath Chattopadhyay	Indian National Congress
Chhatna	ST	Kamala Kanta Hembram	Indian National Congress
Onda	SC	Gokul Behari Das	Indian National Congress
Onda	SC	Ashutosh Mallick	Indian National Congress
Raipur	ST	Jadu Nath Murmu	Indian National Congress
Raipur	ST	Sudha Rani Dutta	Indian National Congress
Vishnupur	SC	Purabi Mukhopadyay	Indian National Congress
Vishnupur	SC	Kiran Chandra Digar	Indian National Congress
Patrasayer	SC	Guru Pada Khan	Indian National Congress
Patrasayer	SC	Bhabataran Chakravarty	Indian National Congress
Kotulpur	None	Jagannath Kolay	Indian National Congress
Arambagh	None	Radha Krishna Pal	Indian National Congress
Khanakul	SC	Panchanan Digpati	Indian National Congress
Khanakul	SC	Prafulla Chandra Sen	Indian National Congress
Tarakeswar	None	Parbati Hazra	Indian National Congress
Dhaniakhali	SC	Radha Nath Das	Indian National Congress
Dhaniakhali	SC	D. N. Mukherjee	Indian National Congress
Balagarh	None	Bejoy Krishna Modak	Communist Party of India
Chinsurah	None	Bhupati Majumder	Indian National Congress
Chandernagore	None	Hirendrra Kumar Chattopadhyay	Independent
Bhadreswar	None	Bomkesh Mazumder	Indian National Congress
Serampore	None	Panchugopal Bhaduri	Communist Party of India
Uttarpara	None	Monoranjan Hazra	Communist Party of India
Singur	None	Provakar Pal	Indian National Congress
Jangipara	SC	Biswanath Saha	Indian National Congress
Jangipara	SC	Kanai Dey	Indian National Congress
Jagatballavpur	None	Brindaban Behari Basu	Forward Bloc
Domjur	None	Tarapada De	Communist Party of India
Bally	None	Monilal Basu	Indian National Congress
Howrah North	None	Samar Mukhopadhyay	Communist Party of India
Howrah West	None	Bankim Chandra Kar	Indian National Congress
Howrah East	None	Beni Chandra Dutta	Indian National Congress
Howrah South	None	Kanailal Bhattacharjee	Forward Bloc
Sankrail	SC	Shyama Prosanna Bhattacharjee	Communist Party of India
Sankrail	SC	Apurbalal Majumdar	Forward Bloc
Uluberia	SC	Abani Kumar Basu	Indian National Congress
Uluberia	SC	Bijoy Bhusan Mondal	Forward Bloc
Shyampur	None	Sasabindu Bera	Forward Bloc
Bagnan	None	Amal Kumar Ganguli	Communist Party of India
Amta East	None	Gobinda Charan Maji	Praja Socialist Party
Amta West	None	Arabinda Roy	Indian National Congress
Daspur	None	Bhabani Ranjan Panja	Indian National Congress
Ghatal	SC	Harendra Nath Dolui	Indian National Congress
Ghatal	SC	Lakshman Chandra Sarkar	Indian National Congress
Garhbeta	ST	Tusar Tudu	Indian National Congress
Garhbeta	ST	Saroj Roy	Communist Party of India
Midnapur	None	Anjali Khan	Indian National Congress
Binpur	ST	Sudhir Kumar Pandey	Communist Party of India
Binpur	ST	Jamadar Hasda	Communist Party of India
Jhargram	None	Mahendra Mahata	Indian National Congress
Gopiballavpur	ST	Surendra Nath Mahata	Indian National Congress
Gopiballavpur	ST	Jagatpati Hansda	Indian National Congress
Kharagpur	None	Narayan Chobey	Communist Party of India
Kharagpur Local	SC	Krishna Prasad Mandal	Indian National Congress
Kharagpur Local	SC	Mrityunjoy Jana	Indian National Congress
Debra	None	Mohini Mohan Pat	Indian National Congress
Sabang	None	Gopal Chandra Das Adhikari	Indian National Congress
Dantan	None	Charu Chandra Mahanty	Indian National Congress
Pataspur	None	Sisir Kumar Das	Praja Socialist Party
Egra	None	Bhuban Chandra Kar Mahapatra	Praja Socialist Party
Ramnagar	None	Trailokya Nath Pradhan	Indian National Congress
Contai South	None	Rashbehari Pal	Indian National Congress
Contai North	None	Natenda Nath Das	Praja Socialist Party
Bhagwanpur	SC	Basanta Kumar Panda	Praja Socialist Party
Bhagwanpur	SC	Bhikari Mandal	Indian National Congress
Panskura West	None	Shyamadas Bhattacharyya	Indian National Congress
Pansuka East	None	Rajani Kanta Pramanik	Indian National Congress
Tamiuk	None	Ajoy Kumar Mukherji	Indian National Congress
Nandigram North	None	Subodh Chandra Maity	Indian National Congress
Nandigram South	None	Bhupal Chandra Panda	Communist Party of India
Mahishadal	SC	Prafulla Chandra Ghosh	Praja Socialist Party
Mahishadal	SC	Mahatab Chand Das	Indian National Congress
Mayna	None	Ananga Mohan Das	Indian National Congress
Cossipore	None	Daben Sen	Praja Socialist Party
Belgachia	None	Ganesh Ghosh	Communist Party of India
Shampukur	None	Hemanata Kumar Bose	Forward Bloc
Burtola North	None	Sudhir Chandra Ray Chaudhuri	Praja Socialist Party
Burtola South	None	Amarendra Nath Basu	Independent
Manicktola	None	Ranendra Nath Sen	Communist Party of India
Jorabagan	None	Nepal Ray	Indian National Congress
Jorasanko	None	Anandilall Poddar	Indian National Congress
Bara Bazar	None	Ishwar Das Jalan	Indian National Congress
Sukeas Street	None	Sihrid Malik Chowdhury	Independent
Vidyasagar	None	Narayan Chandra Roy	Communist Party of India
Beliaghata	SC	Rama Shanker Prasad	Communist Party of India
Beliaghata	SC	Jagat Bose	Communist Party of India
Bow Bazar	None	Bidhan Chandra Roy	Indian National Congress
Muchipara	None	Jatin Chakraborty	Independent
Taltola	None	Dhirendra Nath Dhar	Communist Party of India
Entally	None	A.M.O. Ghani	Communist Party of India
Chowringhee	None	Bijoy Singh Nahar	Indian National Congress
Bhowanipur	None	Siddhartha Snenkar Roy	Indian National Congress
Ballygunge	None	Jnendra Mazumder	Communist Party of India
Rashbehari Avenue	None	Sunil Das	Praja Socialist Party
Alipore	None	Somnath Lahiri	Communist Party of India
Kalighat	None	Manikuntala Sen	Communist Party of India
Ekbalpore	None	Narenda Nath Sen	Indian National Congress
Fort	None	Maitreyee Bose	Indian National Congress
Tollygunge	None	Haridas Mitra	Praja Socialist Party
Garden Reach	None	Shaikh Abduallah Farooquie	Communist Party of India
Behala	None	Rabindra Nath Mukhopadhyay	Communist Party of India
Mahashtola	None	Sudhir Chandra Bhandari	Communist Party of India
Budge Budge	None	Bankim Mukherji	Communist Party of India
Bishnupur	SC	Provash Chandra Roy	Communist Party of India
Bishnupur	SC	Rabindra Nath Roy	Communist Party of India
Baruipur	SC	Khagendra Kumar Roy Chowdhury	Communist Party of India
Baruipur	SC	Gangadhar Naskar	Communist Party of India
Magrahat	SC	Abul Hashem	Indian National Congress
Magrahat	SC	Ardhendu Sekhar Naskar	Indian National Congress
Falta	None	Khagendra Nath Das	Indian National Congress
Diamond Harbour	None	Ramanuj Haider	Praja Socialist Party
Kulpi	None	Hansadhwaj Dhara	Indian National Congress
Kakdwip	None	Maya Banerji	Indian National Congress
Mathurapur	SC	Bhusan Chandra Das	Indian National Congress
Mathurapur	SC	Brindaban Gayen	Indian National Congress
Joynagar	SC	Subodh Banerjee	Independent
Joynagar	SC	Renupada Halder	Independent
Bhangar	None	Hem Chandra Naskar	Indian National Congress
Canning	SC	Khagenda Nath Naskar	Indian National Congress
Canning	SC	Abdus Shokur	Indian National Congress
Sandeshkhali	None	Haran Chandra Mondal	Independent
Hasnabad	SC	Hemanta Kumar Ghosal	Communist Party of India
Hasnabad	SC	Rajkrishna Mondal	Indian National Congress
Basirhat	None	Profulla Nath Banerjee	Indian National Congress
Baduria	None	Md. Zia Ul Haque	Indian National Congress
Swarupnagarr	None	Mohammad Ishaque	Indian National Congress
Haroa	None	Zahangir Kabir	Indian National Congress
Habra	None	Tarun Kanti Ghosh	Indian National Congress
Degsanga	SC	Rafiuddin Ahmed	Indian National Congress
Degsanga	SC	Atul Krishna Roy	Indian National Congress
Baraset	None	Chitto Basu	Forward Bloc
Dum Dum	None	Pabitra Mohan Roy	Praja Socialist Party
Baranagar	None	Jyoti Bose	Communist Party of India
Khardah	None	Satkari Mitra	Praja Socialist Party
Titagarh	None	Krishna Kumar Sukla	Indian National Congress
Noapara	None	Panchanan Bhattacharjee	Praja Socialist Party
Bhatpara	None	Sitaram Gupta	Communist Party of India
Naihati	None	Gopal Basu	Communist Party of India
Bijpur	None	Niranjan Sen Gupta	Communist Party of India
Bongaon	None	Ajit Kumar Ganguli	Communist Party of India
Bongaon	None	Manindra Bhusan Biswas	Indian National Congress
Chakdah	None	Suresh Chandra Banerjee	Praja Socialist Party
Ranaghat	None	Benoy Kumar Chatterjee	Indian National Congress
Haringhatta	SC	Smarajit Bandyopadhyay	Indian National Congress
Haringhatta	SC	Promatha Ranjan Thakur	Indian National Congress
Santipur	None	Haridas Dey	Indian National Congress
Nabadwip	None	Niranjan Modak	Indian National Congress
Krishnagar	None	Jagannath Majumder	Indian National Congress
Nakashipara	SC	Mahananda Haldar	Indian National Congress
Nakashipara	SC	S. M. Fazlur Rahman	Indian National Congress
Tehatta	None	Sankardas Bandyopadhyay	Indian National Congress
Karimpur	None	Bijoy Lal Chattopadhyay	Indian National Congress

== See also ==
- 1957 elections in India
- 1952 West Bengal Legislative Assembly election
