= Forward Communist Party =

Political party in India

Forward Communist Party was a political party in India. FCP was formed in 1948 following a split from the Forward Bloc (Marxist). In FB(M) (today known just as All India Forward Bloc), the then party president K.N. Joglekar opposed the alignment of FB(M) with the United Socialist Organisation of India. Thus Joglekar broke away and formed FCP. He took with him units of FB(M) in West Bengal, Bihar, Maharashtra and Uttar Pradesh.

In 1952 FCP disintegrated into two separate parties, Forward Communist Party (Joglekar) and Forward Communist Party (Anandi Mukherji). The same year, FCP(J) merged with the Communist Party of India and FCP(AM) merged with Bolshevik Party of India.
