= Forward Communist Party (Joglekar) =

Political party in India

Forward Communist Party (Joglekar) was a political party in India. FCP(J) was formed in 1952 following a split in the Forward Communist Party. The group was led by K.N. Joglekar. In the same year as that split, FCP(J) merged with the Communist Party of India.

== Sources ==
- Bose, K. (1988). Forward Bloc. Madras: Tamil Nadu Academy of Political Science.
