= T. M. Kamble =

Indian politician and activist

Trimbak Mukundrao Kamble was an Indian politician and Ambedkarite activist. He was the leader of Republican Party Of India (Democratic), a splinter faction of the Republican Party of India. Kamble was from Maharashtra and a member of the Maharashtra Legislative Council. He was a popular Dalit leader.

Kamble was in politics since the formation of Dalit Panthers. He was a leader of the Namantar Andolan (Name Change Movement) of Marathwada University and an active leader of Dalit Panthers. During 1990–96, he served as a legislator in the Maharashtra Legislative Council. Kamble was the former president of the Republican Party of India (A). He was an Ambedkarite activist and a Buddhist. He left the party after developing differences with senior leader Ramdas Athawale, formed Republican Party of India (Democratic), and became its president.

He died aged 67 in Vivekanand Hospital and Research Center Latur on 28 September 2013.
