= Forward Communist Party (Anandi Mukherji) =

Political party in India

Forward Communist Party (Anandi Mukherji) was a political party in India. FCP(AM) was formed in 1952 following a split in the Forward Communist Party. The group was led by Anandi Mukherji. In the same year as that split, FCP(AM) merged with the Bolshevik Party of India.
