= Left Revolutionary Front =

Left Revolutionary Front may refer to:

- Left Revolutionary Front (Bolivia)
- Revolutionary Left Front (Peru), see Revolutionary Left Movement
- Left Revolutionary Front (Portugal)

== See also ==
- Left Front (disambiguation)
