= 2009 Maharashtra Legislative Assembly election =

2009 Maharashtra state assembly elections
- 13 October 2009

All 288 Assembly Constituencies 145 seats needed for a majority
- Turnout: 59.68% (▼3.94%)

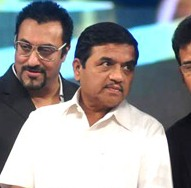

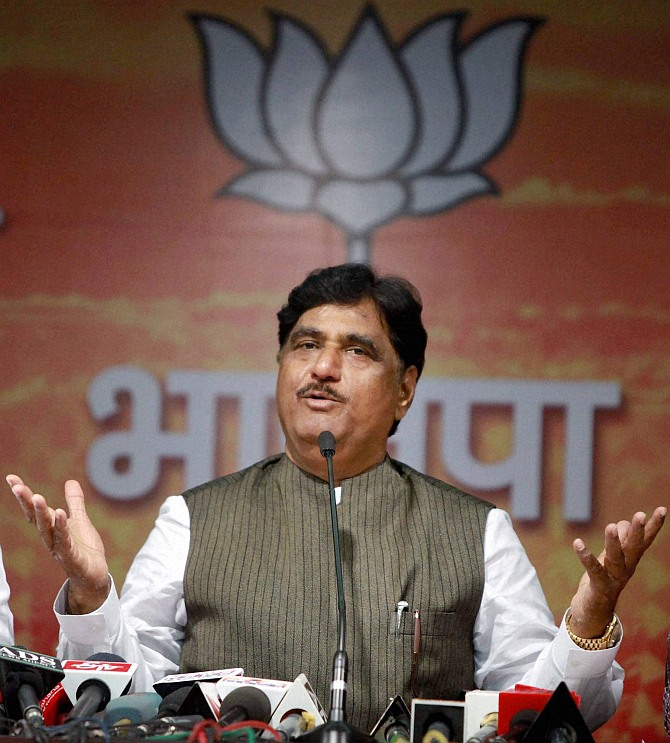

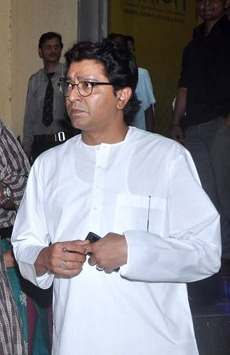
	Majority party	Minority party	Third party
Leader	Ashok Chavan	R.R. Patil	Gopinath Munde
Party	INC	NCP	BJP
Alliance	UPA	UPA	NDA
Leader since	2008	2004	1995
Leader's seat	Bhokar	Tasgaon-Kavathe Mahankal	Did not contest
Last election	69	71	54
Seats won	82	62	46
Seat change	▲13	▼9	▼8
Popular vote	9,521,703	7,420,212	6,352,147
Percentage	21.01%	16.37%	14.02%
Swing	▼0.05%	▼2.38%	▲0.35%
	Fourth party	Fifth party
Leader	Uddhav Thackeray	Raj Thackeray
Party	SS	MNS
Alliance	NDA
Leader since	2003	2006
Leader's seat	Did not contest	Did not contest
Last election	62	New
Seats won	44	13
Seat change	▼18	New
Popular vote	7,369,030	2,585,597
Percentage	16.26%	5.71%
Swing	▼3.71%	New

CM before election
Ashok Chavan
INC
CM-elect
Ashok Chavan
INC

The 13th Assembly elections were held in Maharashtra, India on October 13, 2009. The ruling Democratic Front (Congress and Nationalist Congress Party (NCP)) contested the elections against the alliance of Shiv Sena and Bharatiya Janata Party (BJP) and Against the Third Front Known as Republican Left Democratic Front popularly known as RIDALOS.

Voters elected the 288 members of the Maharashtra Legislative Assembly in newly organized assembly constituencies after the delimitation approved in 2008. The results were declared on October 22, 2009.

== State on a halt for the most eventful day ==
In view of the General Assembly Elections in Maharashtra, the Government of Maharashtra via its notification dated September 29, 2009 declared the day of Polling i.e. Tuesday, October 13, 2009, a Public Holiday in the State under section 25 of the Negotiable Instruments Act, 1881.

== Election day ==
=== Overall polling ===
About 60% of polling was recorded in Maharashtra. In the island city of Mumbai, near about 48% of the total registered voters exercised their franchise. The turnout was slightly better in suburban Mumbai at 52%. Elsewhere in Maharashtra, approximately 60% of the total voters participated in the polling. Congress-MNS worker clashes were reported in Nashik and police had to fire in air to disperse the mob.

=== Naxal scare in Gadchiroli ===
Voting in at least 11 polling stations in two Assembly constituencies, Aheri and Armori of Gadchiroli District was delayed until 2 pm (14:00 hrs IST) following a scare early on the election day when Naxals opened fire in the area. Around 9:30 hrs IST, Naxals fired in Bondhai village in the district, despite the presence of stringent security in the Maoist infested districts of eastern Maharashtra's Vidarbha region.

== Predictions ==
Various news agencies and exit polls had predicted the future outcome of the elections.

Source	Prediction
CNN-IBN	Congress-NCP (135 to 145); Shiv Sena-BJP (105 to 115 ) MNS (8-12); Others (25 - 35)
Maharashtra Times	Shiv Sena-BJP (160)
Star News-Nielsen exit poll	Congress (89); NCP (48); Shiv Sena (62); BJP (51); MNS (12); Third Front and others (26)

== Election statistics ==
- Voter Turnout: 60%
- Number of constituencies: 288
- Number of candidates: 3,559, including 211 women
- Electors: Male 3,97,34,776, Female 3,60,76,469, Total 7,58,11,245
- Polling stations: 84,136
- Constituency with maximum candidates: Aurangabad East - 28
- Constituency with minimum number of candidates: Dahanu (ST) and Islampur - 4 each
- Biggest constituency electorate-wise: Chinchwad (391,644 electors)
- Smallest constituency electorate-wise: Kudal (186,185 electors)

Party-wise no.of Candidates:

Alliance	Party	Seats Contested
UPA	Indian National Congress	171
UPA	Nationalist Congress Party	112
NDA	Shiv Sena	160
NDA	Bharatiya Janata Party	119
Others	Republican Left Democratic Front	200
Others	Maharashtra Navnirman Sena	145
Others	Bahujan Samaj Party	281
Others	Communist Party of India	21
Others	Communist Party of India (Marxist)	19

Indian National Congress 171, Nationalist Congress Party 112, Shiv Sena 160, Bharatiya Janata Party 119, Republican Left Democratic Front RIDALOS 200, MNS 145, BSP 281, Communist Party of India 21, Communist Party of India (Marxist) 19, RJD <--??-->1, Independents + others 2,675 news.outlookindia.com | Assembly Elections: 66% Turnout, 1 Killed

List of Political Parties participated in 2009 Maharashtra Assembly Elections.

Party	Abbreviation
National Parties
Bharatiya Janata Party	BJP
Indian National Congress	INC
Nationalist Congress Party	NCP
Rashtriya Janata Dal	RJD
Communist Party of India (Marxist)	CPM
Communist Party of India	CPI
Bahujan Samaj Party	BSP
State Parties
Shiv Sena	SHS
Janata Dal (United)	JD(U)
Janata Dal (Secular)	JD(S)
Samajwadi Party	SP
All India Forward Bloc	AIFB
Lok Janshakti Party	LJP
Jharkhand Mukti Morcha	JMM
Assam United Democratic Front	AUDF
All India United Democratic Front	AIUDF
All India Anna Dravida Munnetra Kazhagam	AIADMK
Registered (Unrecognised) Parties
Maharashtra Navnirman Sena	MNS
Akhil Bharatiya Hindu Mahasabha	HMS
Akhil Bharatiya Jana Sangh	ABJS
Indian Union Muslim League	IUML
All India Majlis-e-Ittehadul Muslimeen	AIMIM
Swatantra Bharat Paksha	STBP
Akhil Bharatiya Sena	ABHS
Lok Satta Party	LSP
Hindustan Janata Party	HJP
Rashtravadi Janata Party	RVNP
Samajwadi Jan Parishad	SWJP
Samata Party	SAP
Swabhimani Paksha	SWP
Peasants and Workers Party	PWP
Republican Party of India	RPI
Republican Party of India (Khobragade)	RPI(K)
Republican Party of India (Athawale)	RPI(A)
Republican Party of India (Democratic)	RPI(D)
Bharipa Bahujan Mahasangh	BBM
Bahujan Republican Ekta Manch	BREM
Bahujan Vikas Aaghadi	BVA
Jan Surajya Shakti	JSS
Rashtriya Samaj Paksha	RSPS
Apna Dal	AD
Suheldev Bhartiya Samaj Party	SBSP
Indian Justice Party	IJP
Bharatiya Minorities Suraksha Mahasangh	BMSM
All India Minorities Front	AIMF
Democratic Secular Party	DESEP
Peace Party	PECP
Gondwana Ganatantra Party	GGP
Professionals Party of India	PRPI
Shivrajya Party	SVRP
Kranti Kari Jai Hind Sena	KKJHS
All India Krantikari Congress	AIKC
Prabuddha Republican Party	PRCP
Ambedkar National Congress	ANC
Navbharat Nirman Party	NBNP
National Lokhind Party	NLHP
Proutist Sarva Samaj Party	PTSS
Rashtriya Krantikari Samajwadi Party	RKSP
Rashtrawadi Sena	RWS
Akhil Bhartiya Manavata Paksha	ABMP
Aihra National Party	AHNP
Bharatiya Jawala Shakti Paksha	BJSP
Bharatiya Parivartan Party	BPP
Gondwana Mukti Sena	GMS
Hindustani Swaraj Party	HISWP
Lok Bharati	LB
Loksangram	LKSGM
Minorities Democratic Party	MNDP
Nelopa (United)	NEL(U)
Peoples Party of India (Secular)	PPI(S)
Rashtriya Aman Sena	RAS
Republican Paksha (Khoripa)	RP(K)
Republican Party of India (Ektawadi)	RPI(E)
Rashtriya Sant Sandesh Party	RSSDP
Shoshit Samaj Dal	SSD
Sardar Vallabhbhai Patel Party	SVPP
United Secular Congress Party of India	USCPI

== Results ==
=== Final results chart ===
82	62	46	44	50
INC	NCP	BJP	SHS	OTH

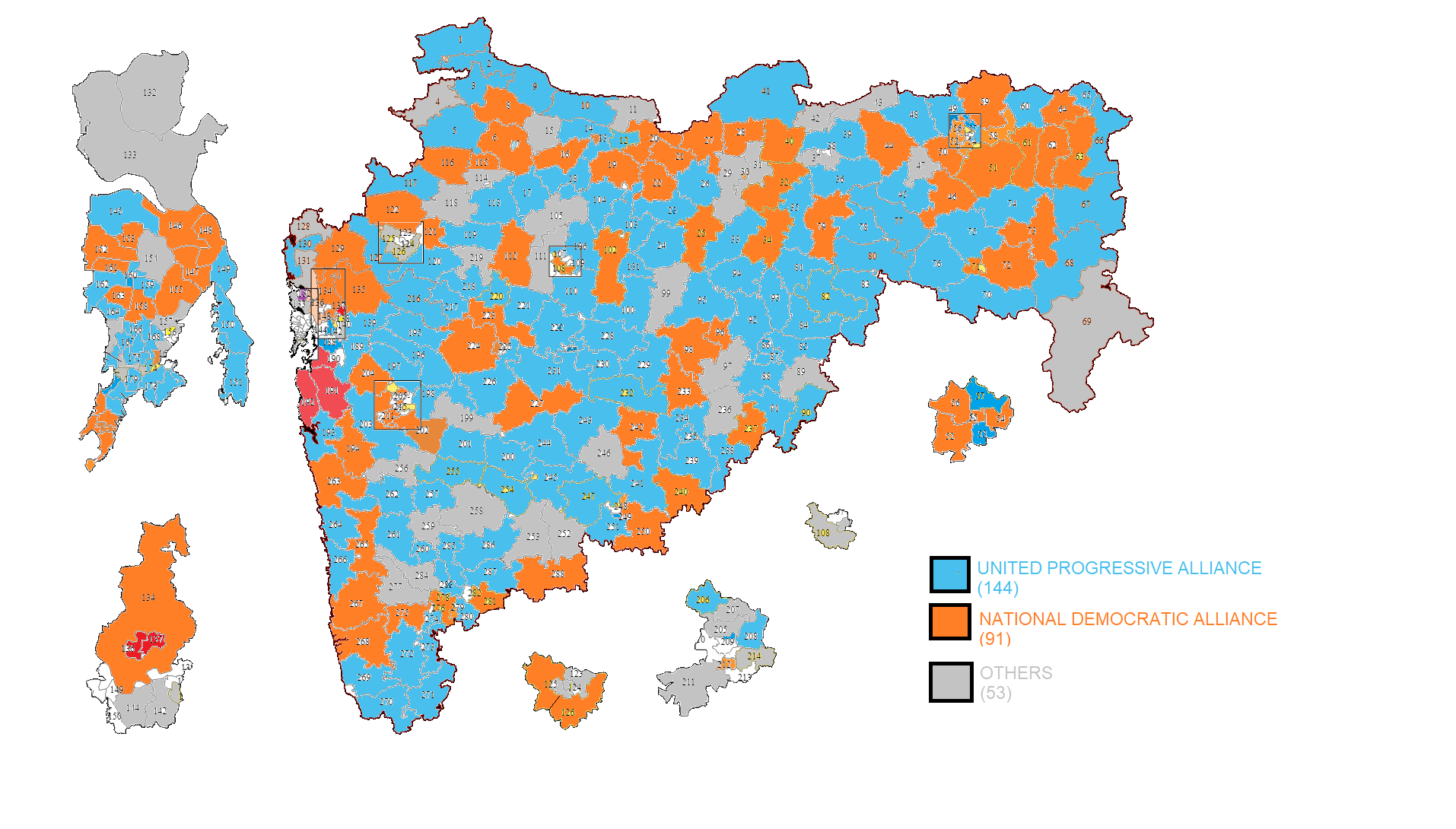

Party	Leader	MLAs			Votes	
Party	Leader		Of total			Of total
Indian National Congress	Ashok Chavan	82	170	82 / 288 (28%)	9,521,703	21.01%
Nationalist Congress Party	R. R. Patil	62	113	62 / 288 (22%)	7,420,212	16.37%
Bharatiya Janata Party	Gopinath Munde	46	119	46 / 288 (16%)	6,352,147	14.02%
Shiv Sena	Balasaheb Thackeray	44	160	44 / 288 (15%)	7,369,030	16.26%
Maharashtra Navnirman Sena	Raj Thackeray	13	143	13 / 288 (5%)	2,585,597	5.71%
Peasants and Workers Party of India	Jayant Prabhakar Patil	04	17	4 / 288 (1%)	503,895	1.11%
Samajwadi Party	Abu Azmi	04	31	4 / 288 (1%)	337,378	0.74%
Jan Surajya Shakti	Vinay Kore	02	37	2 / 288 (0.7%)	575,224	1.27%
Bahujan Vikas Aaghadi	Hitendra Thakur	02	04	2 / 288 (0.7%)	208,321	0.46%
Bharipa Bahujan Mahasangh	Prakash Ambedkar	01	103	1 / 288 (0.3%)	376,645	0.83%
Communist Party of India (Marxist)	Rajaram Ozare	01	20	1 / 288 (0.3%)	270,052	0.60%
Rashtriya Samaj Paksha	Babasaheb Mohanrao Patil	01	26	1 / 288 (0.3%)	187,126	0.41%
Swabhimani Paksha	Raju Shetti	01	14	1 / 288 (0.3%)	352,101	0.78%
Lok Sangram	Anil Anna Gote	01	02	1 / 288 (0.3%)	60,924	0.13%
Independents	-	24	1820	24 / 288 (8%)	7,023,817	15.50
		288			45,314,855	59.68%

Valid votes	45,314,850	99.95%
Invalid votes	23,095	0.05%
Votes cast / turnout	45,337,945	59.68%
Abstentions	30,630,367	40.32%
Registered voters	75,968,312	

Party	Indian National Congress	Nationalist Congress Party	Bharatiya Janata Party	Shiv Sena
Party	United Progressive Alliance		National Democratic Alliance	
Leader				
Leader	Ashok Chavan	R. R. Patil	Gopinath Munde	Uddhav Thackeray
Votes	21.01%	16.37%	14.02%	16.26%
Seats	82 / 288 ▲13	62 / 288 ▼09	46 / 288 ▼08	44 / 288 ▼17

=== City Wise Results ===
City Name	Seats					
City Name	Seats	INC	NCP	BJP	SHS	OTH
Mumbai	35	17	3	5	4	6
Pune	8	2	2	2	2	—N/a
Nagpur	6	2	—N/a	4	—N/a	—N/a
Thane	5	—N/a	2	—N/a	3	—N/a
Pimpri-Chinchwad	6	1	1	1	1	2
Nashik	8	2	—N/a	—N/a	3	—N/a
Kalyan-Dombivli	6	—N/a	1	2	1	2
Vasai-Virar City MC	2	—N/a	—N/a	—N/a	—N/a	2
Aurangabad	3	1	—N/a	—N/a	2	—N/a
Navi Mumbai	2	—N/a	2	—N/a	—N/a	—N/a
Solapur	3	2	—N/a	1	—N/a	—N/a
Mira-Bhayandar	1	—N/a	1	—N/a	—N/a	—N/a
Bhiwandi-Nizampur MC	3	—N/a	—N/a	—N/a	1	2
Jalgaon	5	—N/a	1	1	2	1
Amravati	1	1	—N/a	—N/a	—N/a	—N/a
Nanded	3	3	—N/a	—N/a	—N/a	—N/a
Kolhapur	6	1	2	—N/a	2	—N/a
Ulhasnagar	1	—N/a	—N/a	1	—N/a	—N/a
Sangli-Miraj-Kupwad	2	—N/a	—N/a	2	—N/a	—N/a
Malegaon	2	—N/a	—N/a	—N/a	1	—N/a
Akola	2	—N/a	—N/a	1	—N/a	1
Latur	1	1	—N/a	—N/a	—N/a	—N/a
Dhule	1	—N/a	—N/a	—N/a	—N/a	1
Ahmednagar	1	—N/a	—N/a	—N/a	1	—N/a
Chandrapur	3	—N/a	—N/a	3	—N/a	—N/a
Parbhani	3	—N/a	—N/a	—N/a	2	1
Ichalkaranji	4	1	—N/a	1	1	1
Jalna	3	1	1	—N/a	—N/a	1
Ambarnath	2	—N/a	1	—N/a	1	—N/a
Bhusawal	2	—N/a	1	—N/a	—N/a	1
Panvel	2	1	1	—N/a	—N/a	—N/a
Beed	5	—N/a	4	1	—N/a	—N/a
Gondia	2	1	—N/a	1	—N/a	—N/a
Satara	7	1	4	—N/a	—N/a	2
Solapur	3	2	—N/a	1	—N/a	—N/a
Barshi	1	—N/a	—N/a	—N/a	—N/a	1
Yavatmal	3	2	—N/a	—N/a	1	—N/a
Achalpur	1	—N/a	—N/a	—N/a	—N/a	1
Osmanabad	3	1	—N/a	—N/a	2	—N/a
Nandurbar	4	2	1	—N/a	—N/a	1
Wardha	1	—N/a	—N/a	—N/a	—N/a	1
Udgir	1	—N/a	—N/a	1	—N/a	—N/a
Hinganghat	1	—N/a	—N/a	—N/a	1	—N/a
Total	109	40	14	19	21	15

=== Category wise results ===
Type	Seats					
Type	Seats	INC	NCP	BJP	SHS	OTH
GEN	235	64	52	36	33	50
SC	28	6	6	6	9	1
ST	25	12	4	4	2	3
Total	288	82	62	46	44	53

=== Division-wise results ===
Division Name	Seats	INC		NCP		BJP		SHS		Others
Amravati division	30	12	▲02	03	▼06	05	▲01	05	▼01	05
Aurangabad division	46	18	▲03	12	▼06	02	▼05	07	▼01	07
Konkan division	75	19	▲07	11	▲03	09	▲06	13	▼14	17
Nagpur division	32	12	▼04	02	▼04	13	▼07	03	▼02	02
Nashik division	47	10	▲02	13	▲01	05	▼06	11	▲03	08
Pune division	58	11	▲03	21	▲03	09	Steady	06	▼02	12
Total Seats	288	82	▲13	62	▼09	46	▼08	45	▼17	53

=== District-wise results ===
Name of Division	District	Seats	INC		NCP		BJP		SHS		Others
Amravati Division	Akola	5	0	Steady	0	▼1	2	▲1	1	▼1	2
Amravati Division	Amravati	8	4	▲1	0	▼2	0	▼2	1	Steady	3
Amravati Division	Buldhana	7	2	Steady	1	Steady	2	▲1	2	▲1	0
Amravati Division	Yavatmal	7	5	▲3	1	▼2	0	Steady	1	Steady	0
Amravati Division	Washim	3	1	▼2	1	▼1	1	Steady	0	Steady	0
Total Seats		30	12	▲2	3	▼6	5	▲1	5	▼1	5
Aurangabad Division	Aurangabad	9	3	Steady	1	▼1	0	▼1	2	▲1	3
Aurangabad Division	Beed	6	0	▼2	5	▲2	1	Steady	0	▼2	0
Aurangabad Division	Jalna	5	1	▲1	2	▼3	0	▼1	1	▲1	1
Aurangabad Division	Osmanabad	4	1	Steady	1	▼2	0	▼1	2	▲1	0
Aurangabad Division	Nanded	9	6	▲1	2	▼2	0	▼1	0	▼2	1
Aurangabad Division	Latur	6	4	▲1	0	▼1	1	Steady	0	▼1	1
Aurangabad Division	Parbhani	4	1	▲1	0	Steady	0	▼1	2	▲1	1
Aurangabad Division	Hingoli	3	2	▲1	1	▲1	0	Steady	0	Steady	0
Total Seats		46	18	▲3	12	▼6	2	▼5	7	▼1	7
Konkan Division	Mumbai City	9	6	▲3	1	Steady	1	Steady	0	▼5	1
Konkan Division	Mumbai Suburban	26	11	▲3	2	Steady	4	▲2	4	▼10	5
Konkan Division	Thane	24	1	▲1	6	▲4	4	▲4	5	▲1	8
Konkan Division	Raigad	7	1	Steady	2	Steady	0	Steady	1	▼1	3
Konkan Division	Ratnagiri	3	0	Steady	0	▼1	0	Steady	3	▲1	0
Total Seats		69	19	▲7	11	▲3	9	▲6	13	▼14	17
Nagpur Division	Bhandara	3	1	▼2	1	Steady	0	▼3	1	Steady	0
Nagpur Division	Chandrapur	6	3	▲1	0	▼1	3	▲1	0	▼1	0
Nagpur Division	Gadchiroli	3	2	▲1	0	▼1	0	▼3	0	▼1	1
Nagpur Division	Gondia	4	2	Steady	0	▼1	2	▼2	0	▼1	0
Nagpur Division	Nagpur	12	3	▼3	1	Steady	7	▲3	1	Steady	0
Nagpur Division	Wardha	4	1	▼2	0	▼1	1	▼3	1	▲1	1
Total Seats		32	12	▼4	2	▼4	13	▼7	3	▼2	2
Nashik Division	Dhule	5	2	Steady	0	▼1	1	Steady	1	Steady	1
Nashik Division	Jalgaon	11	0	▼2	5	▲1	2	▼1	2	Steady	2
Nashik Division	Nandurbar	4	2	▲1	1	Steady	0	▼1	0	▲1	1
Nashik Division	Nashik	15	3	▲1	3	▼2	1	▼1	4	▲1	4
Nashik Division	Ahmednagar	12	3	▲2	4	▲3	2	▼2	3	▲2	0
Total Seats		47	10	▲2	13	▲1	5	▼6	11	▲3	8
Pune Division	Kolhapur	10	2	▲1	3	▼2	1	▼1	3	▲1	1
Pune Division	Pune	21	4	▲1	7	Steady	3	▼1	3	▲2	4
Pune Division	Sangli	8	2	▼1	2	▼1	3	▲2	0	▼2	1
Pune Division	Satara	8	1	▲1	5	▲3	0	▼2	0	▼2	2
Pune Division	Solapur	11	2	Steady	4	▼1	2	▲1	0	▼3	3
Total Seats		58	11	▲3	21	▲3	9	Steady	6	▼2	12
Total Seats		288	82	▲13	62	▼9	46	▼8	45	▼17	53

=== Region-wise break up ===
Region	Total seats									Others
Region	Total seats	Indian National Congress		Nationalist Congress Party		Bharatiya Janata Party		Shiv Sena		Others
Region	Total seats	Seats Won		Seats Won		Seats Won		Seats Won		Others
Western Maharashtra	70	14	▼03	25	▼01	11	▲03	09	▼01	12
Vidarbha	62	24	▲05	05	▼04	18	▼01	08	▲04	07
Marathwada	46	18	▲11	12	▲02	02	▼10	05	▼09	07
Thane+Konkan	39	02	Steady	08	▼03	06	▲02	08	▼04	07
Mumbai	36	17	▲02	03	Steady	05	Steady	08	▼01	06
North Maharashtra	35	07	▼03	09	▼03	04	▼02	07	▼06	08
Total	288	82	▲13	62	▼09	46	▼08	45	▼17	53

Region				
Region	Indian National Congress	Nationalist Congress Party	Bharatiya Janata Party	Shiv Sena
Region	Vote Share %	Vote Share %	Vote Share %	Vote Share %
Western Maharashtra	23.9%	44.3%	15%	16.7%
Vidarbha	43.06%	7.8%	34.3%	14.7%
Marathwada	47%	33.1%	9%	10.7%
Thane+Konkan	12.7%	37.8%	12.9%	36.4%
Mumbai	60.6%	9.2%	16.5%	13.5%
North Maharashtra	20.8%	43.4%	21.9%	13.7%
Avg.Vote Share	34.68%	29.27%	18.27%	17.62%

Alliance	Party	Western Maharashtra	Vidarbha	Marathwada	Thane+Konkan	Mumbai	North Maharashtra
United Progressive Alliance	Indian National Congress	14 / 70 (20%)	24 / 62 (39%)	18 / 46 (39%)	02 / 39 (5%)	17 / 36 (47%)	07 / 35 (20%)
United Progressive Alliance	Nationalist Congress Party	25 / 70 (36%)	11 / 62 (18%)	13 / 46 (28%)	6 / 39 (15%)	3 / 36 (8%)	4 / 35 (11%)
National Democratic Alliance	Bharatiya Janata Party	9 / 70 (13%)	21 / 62 (34%)	6 / 46 (13%)	4 / 39 (10%)	5 / 36 (14%)	1 / 35 (3%)
National Democratic Alliance	Shiv Sena	10 / 70 (14%)	4 / 62 (6%)	3 / 46 (7%)	15 / 39 (38%)	11 / 36 (31%)	2 / 35 (6%)
Others	Others	11 / 70 (16%)	14 / 70 (20%)	7 / 46 (15%)	2 / 39 (5%)	6 / 36 (17%)	0 / 35 (0%)

Region	Total Seats	United Progressive Alliance		National Democratic Alliance		Others	
Western Maharashtra	70	▼5	40 / 70 (57%)	▲2	19 / 70 (27%)	▲3	11 / 70 (16%)
Vidarbha	62	Steady	23 / 62 (37%)	▼7	25 / 62 (40%)	▲7	14 / 70 (20%)
Marathwada	46	▲4	30 / 46 (65%)	▼9	9 / 46 (20%)	▲5	7 / 46 (15%)
Thane +Konkan	39	▲4	11 / 39 (28%)	▼10	19 / 39 (49%)	▼1	2 / 39 (5%)
Mumbai	36	Steady	9 / 36 (25%)	▲1	16 / 36 (44%)	▼1	11 / 36 (31%)
North Maharashtra	35	▲1	31 / 35 (89%)	▼2	3 / 35 (9%)	▲1	1 / 35 (3%)
Total		▲4	144 / 288 (50%)	▼15	91 / 288 (32%)	▲1	33 / 288 (11%)

=== Results by constituency ===
District	Constituency		Winner				Runner Up				Margin	%
District	#	Name	Candidate	Party	Votes	%	Candidate	Party	Votes	%	Margin	%
Nandurbar	1	Akkalkuwa (ST)	K. C. Padavi	INC	52,273	36.48	Paradake Rupsing	IND	49,714	34.69	2,559	1.79
Nandurbar	2	Shahada (ST)	Padmakar Vijaysing Valvi	INC	51,222	35.41	Udesingh Kocharu Padvi	SS	38,635	26.71	12,587	8.70
Nandurbar	3	Nandurbar (ST)	Vijaykumar Gavit	NCP	99,323	54.88	Suhasini Natawadkar	BJP	75,465	41.70	23,858	13.18
Nandurbar	4	Nawapur (ST)	Sharad Gavit	SP	75,719	42.94	Surupsingh Hirya Naik	INC	74,024	41.98	1,695	0.96
Dhule	5	Sakri (ST)	Yogendra Bhoye	INC	57,542	40.99	Manjula Gavit	BJP	38,598	27.49	18,944	13.50
Dhule	6	Dhule Rural	Shard Patil	SS	1,00,562	52.15	Rohidas Patil	INC	81,580	42.30	18,982	9.85
Dhule	7	Dhule City	Anil Gote	LKS	59,576	43.67	Rajwardhan Kadambande	NCP	30,835	22.60	28,741	21.07
Dhule	8	Sindkheda	Jayakumar Rawal	BJP	85,656	51.06	Shamkant Saner	INC	34,957	20.84	50,699	30.22
Dhule	9	Shirpur (ST)	Kashiram Pawara	INC	92,088	59.07	Ranjitsinh Pawara	BJP	52,275	33.53	39,813	25.54
Jalgaon	10	Chopda (ST)	Jagdishchandra Valvi	NCP	69,636	43.18	D.P. Salunke	SS	54,798	33.98	14,838	9.20
Jalgaon	11	Raver	Shirish Chaudhari	IND	54,115	35.21	Shobha Patil	BJP	32,579	21.20	21,536	14.01
Jalgaon	12	Bhusawal	Sanjay Sawakare	NCP	61,875	47.03	Rajesh Dhanaji Zalte	SS	57,972	44.06	3,903	2.97
Jalgaon	13	Jalgaon City	Suresh Jain	SS	64,706	52.88	Manoj Dayaram Ch.	IND	33,301	27.22	31,405	25.66
Jalgaon	14	Jalgaon Rural	Gulabrao Deokar	NCP	71,556	44.65	Gulabrao Patil	SS	66,994	41.81	4,562	2.84
Jalgaon	15	Amalner	Krushibhushan Patil	IND	55,084	37.30	Anil Bhaidas Patil	BJP	44,621	30.21	10,463	7.09
Jalgaon	16	Erandol	Chimanrao Patil	SS	70,708	48.22	Satish Patil	NCP	67,410	45.97	3,298	2.25
Jalgaon	17	Chalisgaon	Rajiv Deshmukh	NCP	86,505	48.91	Wadilal Rathod	BJP	78,105	44.16	8,400	4.75
Jalgaon	18	Pachora	Dilip Wagh	NCP	79,715	49.00	Tatyassaheb R. O. Patil	SS	73,501	45.18	6,214	3.82
Jalgaon	19	Jamner	Girish Mahajan	BJP	89,040	50.17	Sanjay Garud	INC	81,523	45.94	7,517	4.23
Jalgaon	20	Muktainagar	Eknath Khadse	BJP	85,708	50.92	Ravindra Patil	NCP	67,319	39.99	18,389	10.93
Buldhana	21	Malkapur	Chainsukh Sancheti	BJP	61,177	39.94	Shivchandra Tayade	INC	49,190	32.11	11,987	7.83
Buldhana	22	Buldhana	Vijayraj Shinde	SS	66,524	46.74	Dhrupadrao Sawale	INC	58,068	40.80	8,456	5.94
Buldhana	23	Chikhli	Rahul Bondre	INC	76,465	48.88	Prakash Jawanjal	BJP	48,549	31.03	27,916	17.85
Buldhana	24	Sindkhed Raja	Rajendra Shingne	NCP	81,808	47.37	Shashikant Khedekar	SS	57,658	33.39	24,150	13.98
Buldhana	25	Mehkar (SC)	Sanjay Raimulkar	SS	91,475	57.97	Sahebrao Sardar	NCP	58,380	37.00	33,095	20.97
Buldhana	26	Khamgaon	Dilipkumar Sananda	INC	64,051	37.36	Dhondiram Khandare	BJP	56,131	32.74	7,920	4.62
Buldhana	27	Jalgaon (Jamod)	Sanjay Kute	BJP	49,224	31.02	Prasenjit Tayade	BBM	45,177	28.47	4,047	2.55
Akola	28	Akot	Sanjay Gawande	SS	37,834	25.56	Sudhakar Gangane	INC	36,869	24.91	965	0.65
Akola	29	Balapur	Baliram Sirskar	IND	39,581	27.84	Rajaya Khateeb	INC	37,991	26.72	1,590	1.12
Akola	30	Akola West	Govardhan Sharma	BJP	44,156	35.19	Ramakant Khetan	INC	32,246	25.70	11,910	9.49
Akola	31	Akola East	Haridas Bhade	BBM	48,438	32.72	Gulabrao Gawande	SS	34,194	23.10	14,244	9.62
Akola	32	Murtijapur (SC)	Harish Pimple	BJP	50,333	39.13	Baldev Palaspagar	BBM	34,975	27.19	15,358	11.94
Washim	33	Risod	Subhash Zanak	INC	51,234	32.15	Anantrao Deshmukh	IND	48,194	30.24	3,040	1.91
Washim	34	Washim (SC)	Lakhan Malik	BJP	65,174	43.10	Alka Makasare	INC	40,945	27.08	24,229	16.02
Washim	35	Karanja	Prakash Dahake	NCP	62,658	38.77	Rajendra Patni	SS	32,283	19.98	30,375	18.79
Amravati	36	Dhamangaon Railway	Virendra Jagtap	INC	72,755	39.93	Arun Adsad	BJP	59,307	32.55	13,448	7.38
Amravati	37	Badnera	Ravi Rana	IND	73,031	46.95	Sulbha Khodke	NCP	54,260	34.88	18,771	12.07
Amravati	38	Amravati	Raosaheb Shekhawat	INC	61,331	43.76	Sunil Deshmukh	IND	55,717	39.76	5,614	4.00
Amravati	39	Teosa	Yashomati Thakur	INC	73,054	49.32	Band Sanjay	SS	46,924	31.68	26,130	17.64
Amravati	40	Daryapur (SC)	Abhijit Adsul	SS	40,606	27.01	Balwant Wankhade	IND	25,948	17.26	14,658	9.75
Amravati	41	Melghat (ST)	Kewalram Kale	INC	63,619	43.51	Rajkumar Dayaram Patel	BJP	62,909	43.02	710	0.49
Amravati	42	Achalpur	Bachchu Kadu	IND	60,627	39.97	Wasudha Deshmukh	INC	54,884	36.18	5,743	3.79
Amravati	43	Morshi	Anil Bonde	IND	43,905	26.55	Nareshchandra Thakre	IND	37,870	22.90	6,035	3.65
Wardha	44	Arvi	Dadarao Keche	BJP	71,694	46.02	Amar Kale	INC	68,564	44.01	3,130	2.01
Wardha	45	Deoli	Ranjit Kamble	INC	58,575	39.40	Ramdas Tadas	BJP	54,829	36.88	3,746	2.52
Wardha	46	Hinganghat	Ashok Shinde	SS	51,285	31.01	Samir Kunawar	IND	49,864	30.15	1,421	0.86
Wardha	47	Wardha	Suresh Deshmukh	IND	52,085	35.41	Shekhar Shende	INC	40,420	27.48	11,665	7.93
Nagpur	48	Katol	Anil Deshmukh	NCP	68,143	42.54	Charansing Thakur	RPI(A)	35,940	22.43	32,203	20.11
Nagpur	49	Savner	Sunil Kedar	INC	82,452	47.13	Ashish Deshmukh	BJP	78,980	45.14	3,472	1.99
Nagpur	50	Hingna	Vijaybabu Ghodmare	BJP	65,039	40.29	Rameshchandra Bang	NCP	64,339	39.86	700	0.43
Nagpur	51	Umred (SC)	Sudhir Parwe	BJP	85,416	49.03	Shirish Meshram	INC	40,720	23.37	44,696	25.66
Nagpur	52	Nagpur South West	Devendra Fadnavis	BJP	89,258	51.02	Vikas Thakre	INC	61,483	35.14	27,775	15.88
Nagpur	53	Nagpur South	Dinanath Padole	INC	69,711	44.37	Kishor Kumeriya	SS	39,316	25.02	30,395	19.35
Nagpur	54	Nagpur East	Krishna Khopde	BJP	88,814	55.15	Satish Chaturvedi	INC	53,598	33.28	35,216	21.87
Nagpur	55	Nagpur Central	Vikas Kumbhare	BJP	56,312	36.47	Ramchandra Deoghare	INC	45,521	29.48	10,791	6.99
Nagpur	56	Nagpur West	Sudhakar Deshmukh	BJP	59,955	37.39	Anees Ahmed	INC	57,976	36.16	1,979	1.23
Nagpur	57	Nagpur North (SC)	Nitin Raut	INC	57,929	37.52	Rajesh Tambe	BJP	40,067	25.95	17,862	11.57
Nagpur	58	Kamthi	Chandrashekhar Bawankule	BJP	95,080	49.36	Ramesh Gawande	INC	63,987	33.22	31,093	16.14
Nagpur	59	Ramtek	Ashish Jaiswal	SS	49,937	32.52	Subodh Mohite	INC	46,576	30.33	3,361	2.19
Bhandara	60	Tumsar	Anil Bawankar	INC	66,557	37.26	Madhukar Kukde	BJP	59,940	33.56	6,617	3.70
Bhandara	61	Bhandara (SC)	Narendra Bhondekar	SS	1,03,880	52.58	Mahendra Gadkari	NCP	52,326	26.48	51,554	26.10
Bhandara	62	Sakoli	Nana Patole	BJP	1,22,168	60.44	Sevak Waghaye	INC	59,253	29.31	62,915	31.13
Gondia	63	Arjuni-Morgaon (SC)	Rajkumar Badole	BJP	69,856	46.60	Ramlal Raut	INC	53,549	35.72	16,307	10.88
Gondia	64	Tirora	Khushal Bopche	BJP	56,450	39.28	Sushilkumar Rahangdale	NCP	55,827	38.85	623	0.43
Gondia	65	Gondiya	Gopaldas Agrawal	INC	75,921	46.53	Rameshkumar Kuthe	SS	65,950	40.42	9,971	6.11
Gondia	66	Amgaon (ST)	Ramrtanbapu Raut	INC	64,975	42.50	Ramesh Taram	BJP	58,158	38.04	6,817	4.46
Gadchiroli	67	Armori (ST)	Anandrao Gedam	INC	41,257	28.43	Surendrasingh Chandel	IND	35,702	24.60	5,555	3.83
Gadchiroli	68	Gadchiroli (ST)	Namdeo Usendi	INC	67,542	43.56	Ashok Nete	BJP	66,582	42.94	960	0.62
Gadchiroli	69	Aheri (ST)	Dipak Atram	IND	61,894	48.63	Dharmaraobaba Atram	NCP	36,697	28.83	25,197	19.80
Chandrapur	70	Rajura	Subhash Dhote	INC	61,476	34.05	Sanjay Dhote	SBP	45,389	25.14	16,087	8.91
Chandrapur	71	Chandrapur (SC)	Nanaji Shamkule	BJP	67,255	44.14	Bita Ramteke	INC	51,845	34.02	15,410	10.12
Chandrapur	72	Ballarpur	Sudhir Mungantiwar	BJP	86,196	49.74	Rahul Pugliya	INC	61,460	35.47	24,736	14.27
Chandrapur	73	Brahmapuri	Atul Deshkar	BJP	50,340	33.48	Sandeep Gaddamwar	IND	44,845	29.82	5,495	3.66
Chandrapur	74	Chimur	Vijay Wadettiwar	INC	89,341	52.85	Vasant Warjurkar	BJP	58,725	34.74	30,616	18.11
Chandrapur	75	Warora	Sanjay Deotale	INC	51,904	33.26	Suresh Dhanorkar	SS	48,164	30.86	3,740	2.40
Yavatmal	76	Wani	Wamanrao Kasawar	INC	55,666	31.94	Vishwas Nandekar	SS	45,226	25.95	10,440	5.99
Yavatmal	77	Ralegaon (ST)	Vasant Purake	INC	74,622	47.43	Ashok Uike	IND	34,204	21.74	40,418	25.69
Yavatmal	78	Yavatmal	Nilesh D. Parwekar	INC	56,370	34.69	Madan Yerawar	BJP	36,495	22.46	19,875	12.23
Yavatmal	79	Digras	Sanjay Rathod	SS	1,04,134	54.13	Sanjay Deshmukh	INC	49,989	25.98	54,145	28.15
Yavatmal	80	Arni (ST)	Shivajirao Moghe	INC	90,882	54.24	Uttam Ingale	BJP	53,301	31.81	37,581	22.43
Yavatmal	81	Pusad	Manohar Naik	NCP	77,136	50.85	Aarti Phupate	SS	46,296	30.52	30,840	20.33
Yavatmal	82	Umarkhed (SC)	Vijayrao Khadse	INC	66,882	44.32	Rajendra Najardhane	BJP	59,507	39.44	7,375	4.88
Nanded	83	Kinwat	Pradeep Jadhav	NCP	69,645	47.55	Bhimrao Keram	BJP	51,483	35.15	18,162	12.40
Nanded	84	Hadgaon	Madhavrao Patil	INC	96,584	59.68	Baburao Kadam Kohalikar	SS	51,803	32.01	44,781	27.67
Nanded	85	Bhokar	Ashok Chavan	INC	1,20,849	79.65	Madhavrao Kinhalkar	IND	13,346	8.80	1,07,503	70.85
Nanded	86	Nanded North	D. P. Sawant	INC	67,052	49.10	Anusaya Khedkar	SS	22,970	16.82	44,082	32.28
Nanded	87	Nanded South	Omprakash Pokarna	INC	71,367	51.70	Hemant Patil	SS	53,904	39.05	17,463	12.65
Nanded	88	Loha	Shankar Dhondge	NCP	81,539	47.17	Prataprao Chikhalikar	LKB	72,175	41.75	9,364	5.42
Nanded	89	Naigaon	Vasantrao Chavan	IND	63,534	37.17	Bapusaheb G. Deshmukh	NCP	52,414	30.67	11,120	6.50
Nanded	90	Deglur (SC)	Raosaheb Antapurkar	INC	64,409	41.57	Subhash Sabne	SS	58,398	37.69	6,011	3.88
Nanded	91	Mukhed	Hanmanthrao Patil	INC	66,013	41.17	Govind Rathod	IND	64,797	40.41	1,216	0.76
Hingoli	92	Basmath	Jayprakash Dandegaonkar	NCP	81,357	45.62	Jaiprakash Mundada	SS	78,513	44.03	2,844	1.59
Hingoli	93	Kalamnuri	Rajeev Satav	INC	67,804	40.46	Gajanan Ghuge	SS	59,577	35.55	8,227	4.91
Hingoli	94	Hingoli	Bhaurao Patil	INC	58,755	36.57	Tanaji Mutkule	BJP	54,810	34.12	3,945	2.45
Parbhani	95	Jintur	Ramprasad Kadam	INC	76,427	39.13	Vijay Bhamale	IND	75,202	38.50	1,225	0.63
Parbhani	96	Parbhani	Sanjay Jadhav	SS	66,021	40.59	Vikhar Ahemad	IND	45,498	27.97	20,523	12.62
Parbhani	97	Gangakhed	Sitaram Ghandat	IND	80,404	37.00	Madhusudan Kendre	BJP	61,524	28.31	18,880	8.69
Parbhani	98	Pathri	Mira Renge	SS	89,056	46.36	Babajani Durani	NCP	78,031	40.62	11,025	5.74
Jalna	99	Partur	Sureshkumar Jethaliya	IND	42,702	25.72	Babanrao Lonikar	BJP	31,200	18.79	11,502	6.93
Jalna	100	Ghansawangi	Rajesh Tope	NCP	1,04,206	54.22	Arjun Khotkar	SS	80,899	42.09	23,307	12.13
Jalna	101	Jalna	Kailas Gorantyal	INC	74,400	52.21	Bhaskar Ambekar	SS	53,629	37.63	20,771	14.58
Jalna	102	Badnapur (SC)	Santosh Sambre	SS	56,242	36.93	Sudamrao Sandu	NCP	37,334	24.51	18,908	12.42
Jalna	103	Bhokardan	Chandrakant Danve	NCP	67,480	41.36	Nirmala Danve	BJP	65,841	40.36	1,639	1.00
Aurangabad	104	Sillod	Abdul Sattar	INC	98,131	55.00	Suresh Bankar	BJP	71,378	40.01	26,753	14.99
Aurangabad	105	Kannad	Harshvardhan Jadhav	MNS	46,106	26.98	Udaysingh Rajput	IND	41,999	24.57	4,107	2.41
Aurangabad	106	Phulambri	Kalyan Kale	INC	63,236	38.12	Haribhau Bagade	BJP	60,649	36.56	2,587	1.56
Aurangabad	107	Aurangabad Central	Pradeep Jaiswal	IND	49,965	36.76	Abdul Kadeer	NCP	41,581	30.59	8,384	6.17
Aurangabad	108	Aurangabad West (SC)	Sanjay Shirsat	SS	58,008	48.41	Chandrabhan Parkhe	INC	43,797	36.55	14,211	11.86
Aurangabad	109	Aurangabad East	Rajendra Darda	INC	48,190	38.55	Bhagwat Karad	BJP	32,965	26.37	15,225	12.18
Aurangabad	110	Paithan	Sanjay Waghchaure	NCP	64,179	40.36	Sandipanrao Bhumre	SS	50,517	31.77	13,662	8.59
Aurangabad	111	Gangapur	Prashant Bamb	IND	53,067	35.72	Annasaheb Mane Patil	SS	29,568	19.90	23,499	15.82
Aurangabad	112	Vaijapur	R. M. Wani	SS	51,379	30.48	B. P. Chikatgaonkar	IND	50,154	29.76	1,225	0.72
Nashik	113	Nandgaon	Pankaj Bhujbal	NCP	96,292	53.33	Sanjay Pawar	SS	74,923	41.49	21,369	11.84
Nashik	114	Malegaon Central	Md. Ismail Ab. Khalique	JSS	71,157	47.04	Sk. Rasheed Haji	INC	53,238	35.19	17,919	11.85
Nashik	115	Malegaon Outer	Dadaji Bhuse	SS	95,137	52.75	Prashant Hiray	NCP	65,073	36.08	30,064	16.67
Nashik	116	Baglan (ST)	Umaji Borse	BJP	55,022	45.33	Sanjay Chavan	IND	52,460	43.22	2,562	2.11
Nashik	117	Kalwan (ST)	Arjun Pawar	NCP	74,388	50.59	Jiva Pandu Gavit	CPI(M)	58,135	39.54	16,253	11.05
Nashik	118	Chandvad	Shirishkumar Kotwal	IND	57,655	36.47	Uttam Bhalerao	NCP	39,345	24.89	18,310	11.58
Nashik	119	Yevla	Chhagan Bhujbal	NCP	1,06,416	63.14	Manikrao Shinde Patil	SS	56,236	33.37	50,180	29.77
Nashik	120	Sinnar	Manikrao Kokate	INC	75,630	48.50	Prakash Waje	SS	72,800	46.68	2,830	1.82
Nashik	121	Niphad	Anil Kadam	SS	90,065	56.06	Dilip Bankar	NCP	56,920	35.43	33,145	20.63
Nashik	122	Dindori (ST)	Dhanraj Mahale	SS	68,569	43.70	Narhari Zirwal	NCP	68,420	43.60	149	0.10
Nashik	123	Nashik East	Uttamrao Dhikale	MNS	47,924	34.39	Balasaheb Mahadu Sanap	BJP	29,189	20.94	18,735	13.45
Nashik	124	Nashik Central	Vasantrao Gite	MNS	62,167	46.42	Shobha Bachchhav	INC	30,998	23.15	31,169	23.27
Nashik	125	Nashik West	Nitin Bhosale	MNS	52,855	35.03	Nana Mahale	NCP	28,117	18.63	24,738	16.40
Nashik	126	Devlali (SC)	Baban Gholap	SS	45,761	38.73	Nanasaheb Sonawane	NCP	35,641	30.16	10,120	8.57
Nashik	127	Igatpuri (ST)	Nirmala Gavit	INC	29,155	23.46	Kashinath Mengal	MNS	25,433	20.47	3,722	2.99
Palghar	128	Dahanu (ST)	Rajaram Ozare	CPI(M)	62,530	47.28	Krushna Ghoda	NCP	46,350	35.05	16,180	12.23
Palghar	129	Vikramgad (ST)	Chintaman Vanaga	BJP	47,371	32.09	Chandrakant Bhusara	NCP	42,339	28.68	5,032	3.41
Palghar	130	Palghar (ST)	Rajendra Gavit	INC	55,665	41.80	Manisha Nimkar	SS	34,694	26.05	20,971	15.75
Palghar	131	Boisar (ST)	Vilas Tare	BVA	53,727	38.95	Sunil Dhanava	SS	40,649	29.47	13,078	9.48
Palghar	132	Nalasopara	Kshitij Thakur	BVA	89,284	52.84	Shrish Chavan	SS	48,502	28.71	40,782	24.13
Palghar	133	Vasai	Vivek Pandit	IND	81,358	48.35	Narayan Mankar	BVA	64,560	38.37	16,798	9.98
Thane	134	Bhiwandi Rural (ST)	Vishnu Savara	BJP	46,996	34.67	Shantaram Dundaram Patil	NCP	44,804	33.06	2,192	1.61
Thane	135	Shahapur (ST)	Daulat Daroda	SS	58,334	40.48	Pandurang Barora	NCP	46,065	31.97	12,269	8.51
Thane	136	Bhiwandi West	Rashid Tahir Momin	SP	30,825	29.83	Sainath Pawar	IND	29,134	28.19	1,691	1.64
Thane	137	Bhiwandi East	Abu Azmi	SP	37,584	42.07	Yogesh Patil	SS	24,599	27.54	12,985	14.53
Thane	138	Kalyan West	Prakash Bhoir	MNS	41,111	28.36	Rajendra Deolekar	SS	35,562	24.53	5,549	3.83
Thane	139	Murbad	Kisan Kathore	NCP	55,830	31.27	Gotiram Padu Pawar	IND	49,288	27.61	6,542	3.66
Thane	140	Ambernath (SC)	Balaji Kinikar	SS	50,470	44.66	Mahesh Tapase	NCP	30,491	26.98	19,979	17.68
Thane	141	Ulhas Nagar	Kumar Ailani	BJP	45,257	42.38	Suresh Kalani	IND	37,719	35.32	7,538	7.06
Thane	142	Kalyan East	Ganpat Gaikwad	IND	60,592	49.10	Pundlik Mhatre	SS	36,106	29.26	24,486	19.84
Thane	143	Dombivali	Ravindra Chavan	BJP	61,104	47.60	Rajesh Kadam	MNS	48,777	38.00	12,327	9.60
Thane	144	Kalyan Rural	Ramesh Ratan Patil	MNS	51,149	41.37	Ramesh Mhatre	SS	41,642	33.68	9,507	7.69
Thane	145	Mira Bhayandar	Gilbert Mendonca	NCP	62,013	42.02	Narendra Mehta	BJP	51,409	34.83	10,604	7.19
Thane	146	Ovala-Majiwada	Pratap Sarnaik	SS	52,373	36.03	Sudhakar Chavan	MNS	43,332	29.81	9,041	6.22
Thane	147	Kopri-Pachpakhadi	Eknath Shinde	SS	73,502	45.36	Manoj Shinde	INC	40,726	25.13	32,776	20.23
Thane	148	Thane	Rajan Vichare	SS	51,010	32.22	Rajan Raje	MNS	48,569	30.68	2,441	1.54
Thane	149	Mumbra-Kalwa	Jitendra Awhad	NCP	61,510	46.57	Rajan Kine	SS	45,821	34.69	15,689	11.88
Thane	150	Airoli	Sandeep Naik	NCP	79,075	50.13	Vijay Chougule	SS	67,118	42.55	11,957	7.58
Thane	151	Belapur	Ganesh Naik	NCP	59,685	40.78	Suresh Haware	BJP	46,812	31.99	12,873	8.79
Mumbai Suburban	152	Borivali	Gopal Shetty	BJP	68,926	47.43	Nayan Kadam	MNS	38,699	26.63	30,227	20.80
Mumbai Suburban	153	Dahisar	Vinod Ghosalkar	SS	60,069	45.67	Yogesh Dube	INC	43,913	33.39	16,156	12.28
Mumbai Suburban	154	Magathane	Pravin Darekar	MNS	58,310	40.00	Prakash Surve	NCP	45,325	31.09	12,985	8.91
Mumbai Suburban	155	Mulund	Sardar Tara Singh	BJP	65,748	44.00	Satyavan Dalvi	MNS	37,772	25.28	27,976	18.72
Mumbai Suburban	156	Vikhroli	Mangesh Sangle	MNS	53,125	42.87	Pallavi Sanjay Patil	NCP	32,713	26.40	20,412	16.47
Mumbai Suburban	157	Bhandup West	Shishir Shinde	MNS	68,302	45.91	Shiwajirao Nalawade	NCP	37,359	25.11	30,943	20.80
Mumbai Suburban	158	Jogeshwari East	Ravindra Waikar	SS	64,318	43.92	Bhai Jagtap	INC	50,543	34.52	13,775	9.40
Mumbai Suburban	159	Dindoshi	Rajhans Singh	INC	46,278	34.04	Sunil Prabhu	SS	40,413	29.73	5,865	4.31
Mumbai Suburban	160	Kandivali East	Thakur Ramesh Singh	INC	50,138	42.92	Jaiprakash Thakur	BJP	38,832	33.24	11,306	9.68
Mumbai Suburban	161	Charkop	Yogesh Sagar	BJP	58,687	45.74	Bharat Parekh	INC	42,324	32.99	16,363	12.75
Mumbai Suburban	162	Malad West	Aslam Shaikh	INC	51,635	43.49	R. U. Singh	BJP	23,940	20.16	27,695	23.33
Mumbai Suburban	163	Goregaon	Subhash Desai	SS	69,117	47.44	Sharad Rao	NCP	44,302	30.41	24,815	17.03
Mumbai Suburban	164	Versova	Baldev Khosa	INC	44,814	44.54	Yashodhar Phanse	SS	32,784	32.58	12,030	11.96
Mumbai Suburban	165	Andheri West	Ashok Jadhav	INC	59,899	49.30	Vishnu V. Korgaonkar	SS	27,741	22.83	32,158	26.47
Mumbai Suburban	166	Andheri East	Suresh Shetty	INC	55,990	40.74	Ramesh Latke	SS	50,837	36.99	5,153	3.75
Mumbai Suburban	167	Vile Parle	Krishna Hegde	INC	44,338	33.94	Vinayak Raut	SS	42,634	32.64	1,704	1.30
Mumbai Suburban	168	Chandivali	Mohammed Arif Khan	INC	82,616	51.65	Dilip Lande	MNS	48,901	30.57	33,715	21.08
Mumbai Suburban	169	Ghatkopar West	Ram Kadam	MNS	60,343	42.21	Poonam Mahajan	BJP	34,115	23.86	26,228	18.35
Mumbai Suburban	170	Ghatkopar East	Prakash Mehta	BJP	43,600	35.12	Virendra Bakshi	INC	33,185	26.73	10,415	8.39
Mumbai Suburban	171	Mankhurd Shivaji Nagar	Abu Azmi	SP	38,435	33.65	Syed Ahmad	INC	24,318	21.29	14,117	12.36
Mumbai Suburban	172	Anushakti Nagar	Nawab Malik	NCP	38,928	35.32	Tukaram Kate	SS	32,103	29.13	6,825	6.19
Mumbai Suburban	173	Chembur	Chandrakant Handore	INC	47,431	38.42	Anil Chauhan	MNS	29,465	23.87	17,966	14.55
Mumbai Suburban	174	Kurla (SC)	Milind Kamble	NCP	41,891	34.56	Mangesh Kudalkar	SS	34,920	28.81	6,971	5.75
Mumbai Suburban	175	Kalina	Kripashankar Singh	INC	51,205	43.68	Chandrakant More	MNS	38,284	32.66	12,921	11.02
Mumbai Suburban	176	Vandre East	Bala Sawant	SS	45,659	38.22	Janardan Chandurkar	INC	38,239	32.01	7,420	6.21
Mumbai Suburban	177	Vandre West	Baba Siddique	INC	59,659	46.52	Ashish Shelar	BJP	57,968	45.20	1,691	1.32
Mumbai City	178	Dharavi (SC)	Varsha Gaikwad	INC	52,492	49.75	Raibage Manohar Kedari	SS	42,783	40.55	9,709	9.20
Mumbai City	179	Sion Koliwada	Jagannath Shetty	INC	45,638	39.11	Manisha Kayande	BJP	27,615	23.67	18,023	15.44
Mumbai City	180	Wadala	Kalidas Kolambkar	INC	55,795	49.70	Digambar Kandarkar	SS	25,765	22.95	30,030	26.75
Mumbai City	181	Mahim	Nitin Sardesai	MNS	48,734	37.82	Sada Sarvankar	INC	39,808	30.89	8,926	6.93
Mumbai City	182	Worli	Sachin Ahir	NCP	52,398	37.83	Ashish Chemburkar	SS	47,104	34.01	5,294	3.82
Mumbai City	183	Shivadi	Bala Nandgaonkar	MNS	64,375	45.71	Dagadu Sakpal	SS	57,912	41.12	6,463	4.59
Mumbai City	184	Byculla	Madhukar Chavan	INC	36,302	31.22	Sanjay Naik	MNS	27,198	23.39	9,104	7.83
Mumbai City	185	Malabar Hill	Mangal Lodha	BJP	58,530	47.73	Rajkumar Bafna	INC	33,971	27.70	24,559	20.03
Mumbai City	186	Mumba Devi	Amin Patel	INC	45,285	46.83	Anil Padwal	SS	28,646	29.62	16,639	17.21
Mumbai City	187	Colaba	Annie Shekhar	INC	39,779	40.33	Raj K. Purohit	BJP	31,722	32.16	8,057	8.17
Raigad	188	Panvel	Prashant Thakur	INC	80,671	49.11	Balaram Patil	PWPI	67,710	41.22	12,961	7.89
Raigad	189	Karjat	Suresh Lad	NCP	41,727	28.67	Devendra Satam	SS	25,917	17.81	15,810	10.86
Raigad	190	Uran	Vivek Patil	PWPI	82,017	53.92	Shyam Mhatre	INC	61,992	40.75	20,025	13.17
Raigad	191	Pen	Dhairyashil Patil	PWPI	60,757	34.19	Ravisheth Patil	INC	53,141	29.90	7,616	4.29
Raigad	192	Alibag	Meenakshi Patil	PWPI	93,173	53.61	Thakur Madhukar	INC	69,025	39.72	24,148	13.89
Raigad	193	Shrivardhan	Sunil Tatkare	NCP	66,141	47.71	Tukaram Surve	SS	55,270	39.86	10,871	7.85
Raigad	194	Mahad	Bharatshet Gogawale	SS	85,650	51.61	Manik Jagtap	NCP	71,600	43.14	14,050	8.47
Pune	195	Junnar	Vallabh Benke	NCP	79,360	48.53	Asha Buchake	SS	72,902	44.58	6,458	3.95
Pune	196	Ambegaon	Dilip Walse-Patil	NCP	99,851	58.17	Kalpana Adhalrao Patil	SS	62,502	36.41	37,349	21.76
Pune	197	Khed Alandi	Dilip Mohite	NCP	64,726	38.61	Ashok Khandebharad	SS	43,934	26.21	20,792	12.40
Pune	198	Shirur	Ashok Raosaheb Pawar	NCP	53,936	29.43	Baburao Pacharne	IND	46,369	25.30	7,567	4.13
Pune	199	Daund	Ramesh Thorat	IND	85,764	48.75	Rahul Kul	NCP	68,322	38.84	17,442	9.91
Pune	200	Indapur	Harshvardhan Patil	INC	92,729	48.63	Dattatray Bharne	IND	84,769	44.45	7,960	4.18
Pune	201	Baramati	Ajit Pawar	NCP	1,28,544	68.26	Ranjankumar Taware	IND	25,747	13.67	1,02,797	54.59
Pune	202	Purandar	Vijay Shivtare	SS	67,998	38.43	Digambar Durgade	NCP	44,529	25.16	23,469	13.27
Pune	203	Bhor	Sangram Thopate	INC	59,041	31.12	Sharad Dhamale	SS	40,461	21.32	18,580	9.80
Pune	204	Maval	Bala Bhegade	BJP	83,158	45.30	Bapu Bhegde	NCP	68,840	37.50	14,318	7.80
Pune	205	Chinchwad	Laxman Jagtap	IND	78,741	39.78	Shrirang Barne	SS	72,166	36.46	6,575	3.32
Pune	206	Pimpri (SC)	Anna Bansode	NCP	61,061	41.69	Amar Shankar Sable	BJP	51,534	35.19	9,527	6.50
Pune	207	Bhosari	Vilas Lande	IND	50,472	30.46	Sulabha Ubale	SS	49,200	29.69	1,272	0.77
Pune	208	Vadgaol Sheri	Bapusaheb Pathare	NCP	72,034	43.01	Ajay Bhosale	SS	38,918	23.24	33,116	19.77
Pune	209	Shivajinagar	Vinayak Nimhan	INC	50,918	39.31	Vikas Mathkari	BJP	30,388	23.46	20,530	15.85
Pune	210	Kothrud	Chandrakant Mokate	SS	52,055	33.65	Kishor Shinde	MNS	44,843	28.99	7,212	4.66
Pune	211	Khadakwasala	Ramesh Wanjale	MNS	79,006	44.93	Vikas Dangat	NCP	56,488	32.12	22,518	12.81
Pune	212	Parvati	Madhuri Misal	BJP	64,959	42.00	Sachin Taware	NCP	46,743	30.22	18,216	11.78
Pune	213	Hadapsar	Mahadeo Babar	SS	65,517	39.74	Chandrakant Shivarkar	INC	55,208	33.49	10,309	6.25
Pune	214	Pune Cantonment (SC)	Ramesh Bagwe	INC	65,638	57.38	Sadanand Shetty	SS	28,313	24.75	37,325	32.63
Pune	215	Kasba Peth	Girish Bapat	BJP	54,982	35.34	Ravindra Dhangekar	MNS	46,820	30.09	8,162	5.25
Ahmednagar	216	Akole (ST)	Madhukar Pichad	NCP	60,043	43.77	Madhukar Talpade	SS	50,964	37.15	9,079	6.62
Ahmednagar	217	Sangamner	Balasaheb Thorat	INC	96,686	63.14	Babasaheb Kute Dhondiba	SS	41,310	26.98	55,376	36.16
Ahmednagar	218	Shirdi	Radhakrishna Vikhe Patil	INC	80,301	52.72	Rajendra Pipada	SS	66,992	43.99	13,309	8.73
Ahmednagar	219	Kopargaon	Ashok Kale	SS	84,680	48.84	Bipin Kolhe	NCP	77,989	44.98	6,691	3.86
Ahmednagar	220	Shrirampur (SC)	Bhausaheb Malhari Kamble	INC	59,819	38.81	Bhausaheb Dolas	SS	38,922	25.25	20,897	13.56
Ahmednagar	221	Nevasa	Shankarrao Gadakh	NCP	91,429	53.47	Vitthal Langhe	BJP	69,943	40.90	21,486	12.57
Ahmednagar	222	Shevgaon	Chandrashekhar Ghule	NCP	81,890	38.73	Pratap Dhakane	BJP	61,746	29.20	20,144	9.53
Ahmednagar	223	Rahuri	Shivaji Kardile	BJP	57,380	33.55	Prasad Tanpure	NCP	49,047	28.68	8,333	4.87
Ahmednagar	224	Parner	Vijayrao Bhaskarrao Auti	SS	75,538	45.03	Sujit Zaware Patil	IND	48,515	28.92	27,023	16.11
Ahmednagar	225	Ahmednagar City	Anil Rathod	SS	65,271	49.25	Suvalal Gundecha	INC	25,726	19.41	39,545	29.84
Ahmednagar	226	Shrigonda	Babanrao Pachpute	NCP	80,418	42.10	Rajendra Nagawade	BJP	52,973	27.73	27,445	14.37
Ahmednagar	227	Karjat Jamkhed	Ram Shinde	BJP	42,845	25.02	Keshevrao Deshmukh	INC	32,673	19.08	10,172	5.94
Beed	228	Georai	Badamrao Pandit	NCP	1,00,816	46.25	Amarsinha Pandit	BJP	98,469	45.18	2,347	1.07
Beed	229	Majalgaon	Prakashdada Solanke	NCP	86,943	46.22	R. T. Deshmukh	BJP	79,034	42.01	7,909	4.21
Beed	230	Beed	Jaydattaji Kshirsagar	NCP	1,09,163	57.65	Sunil Dhande	SS	33,246	17.56	75,917	40.09
Beed	231	Ashti	Suresh Dhas	NCP	1,18,847	55.19	Balasaheb Ajabe	BJP	84,157	39.08	34,690	16.11
Beed	232	Kaij (SC)	Vimal Mundada	NCP	1,10,452	57.71	Venkatrao Netke	BJP	66,188	34.58	44,264	23.13
Beed	233	Parli	Pankaja Munde	BJP	96,222	57.56	Trimbak Munde	INC	60,160	35.99	36,062	21.57
Latur	234	Latur Rural	Vaijnath Shinde	INC	86,136	46.19	Ramesh Karad	BJP	62,553	33.55	23,583	12.64
Latur	235	Latur City	Amit Deshmukh	INC	1,13,006	64.91	Kayyumkhan Pathan	BSP	23,526	13.51	89,480	51.40
Latur	236	Ahmadpur	Babasaheb Mohanrao Patil	RSPS	69,460	37.32	Vinayakrao Jadhav Patil	INC	67,208	36.11	2,252	1.21
Latur	237	Udgir (SC)	Sudhakar Bhalerao	BJP	73,840	46.80	Machindra Kaamant	NCP	56,563	35.85	17,277	10.95
Latur	238	Nilanga	Shivajirao Patil Nilangekar	INC	78,267	42.73	Sambhaji Patil Nilangekar	BJP	70,763	38.64	7,504	4.09
Latur	239	Ausa	Basavraj Patil	INC	84,526	50.89	Dinkar Baburao Mane	SS	69,731	41.98	14,795	8.91
Osmanabad	240	Umarga (SC)	Dnyanraj Chougule	SS	70,806	44.79	Baburao Gaikwad	INC	60,474	38.25	10,332	6.54
Osmanabad	241	Tuljapur	Madhukarrao Chavan	INC	65,802	33.51	Subhash Deshmukh	BJP	49,469	25.19	16,333	8.32
Osmanabad	242	Osmanabad	Omprakash Rajenimbalkar	SS	1,00,709	50.33	Rana Jagjit Sinha Patil	NCP	83,735	41.85	16,974	8.48
Osmanabad	243	Paranda	Rahul Mote	NCP	83,425	46.44	Shankar Borkar	SS	77,423	43.10	6,002	3.34
Solapur	244	Karmala	Digambar Bagal	NCP	70,943	42.65	Narayan Patil	JSS	43,126	25.92	27,817	16.73
Solapur	245	Madha	Babanrao Vitthalrao Shinde	NCP	1,10,224	61.26	Shivaji Sawant	IND	47,055	26.15	63,169	35.11
Solapur	246	Barshi	Dilip Sopal	IND	90,523	46.14	Rajendra Raut	INC	80,314	40.94	10,209	5.20
Solapur	247	Mohol (SC)	Laxman Dhobale	NCP	81,631	52.70	Nagnath Kshirsagar	IND	52,452	33.86	29,179	18.84
Solapur	248	Solapur City North	Vijay Deshmukh	BJP	62,363	45.60	Mahesh Kothe	INC	52,273	38.22	10,090	7.38
Solapur	249	Solapur City Central	Praniti Shinde	INC	68,028	49.71	Narasayya Adam	CPI(M)	34,664	25.33	33,364	24.38
Solapur	250	Akkalkot	Sidramappa Patil	BJP	92,496	47.26	Siddharam Mhetre	INC	91,111	46.55	1,385	0.71
Solapur	251	Solapur South	Dilip Mane	INC	72,068	52.58	Ratikant Patil	SS	54,406	39.69	17,662	12.89
Solapur	252	Pandharpur	Bharat Bhalke	SWP	1,06,141	56.24	Vijaysinh Mohite–Patil	NCP	68,778	36.44	37,363	19.80
Solapur	253	Sangole	Ganpatrao Deshmukh	PWPI	86,548	47.16	Shahajibapu Patil	INC	76,744	41.82	9,804	5.34
Solapur	254	Malshiras (SC)	Hanumant Dolas	NCP	82,360	47.43	Uttamrao Jankar	IND	66,134	38.09	16,226	9.34
Satara	255	Phaltan (SC)	Dipak Pralhad Chavan	NCP	71,506	46.95	Baburao Mane	SS	31,592	20.75	39,914	26.20
Satara	256	Wai	Makrand Jadhav-Patil	IND	80,887	40.72	Madan Bhosale	INC	59,062	29.73	21,825	10.99
Satara	257	Koregaon	Shashikant Shinde	NCP	80,373	49.65	Shalini Patil	IND	48,620	30.03	31,753	19.62
Satara	258	Man	Jaykumar Gore	IND	60,703	32.31	Sadashiv Pol	NCP	56,605	30.13	4,098	2.18
Satara	259	Karad North	Shamrao Pandurang Patil	IND	1,01,658	57.12	Atulbaba S. Bhosale	NCP	60,571	34.04	41,087	23.08
Satara	260	Karad South	Vilasrao Patil	INC	82,857	49.35	Vilasrao G. Patel	IND	67,944	40.47	14,913	8.88
Satara	261	Patan	Vikramsinh Patankar	NCP	87,917	48.15	Shambhuraj Desai	SS	87,337	47.83	580	0.32
Satara	262	Satara	Shivendra Raje Bhosale	NCP	1,27,143	77.71	Narendra Patil	BJP	21,365	13.06	1,05,778	64.65
Ratnagiri	263	Dapoli	Suryakant Dalvi	SS	74,973	53.59	Vijay Bhosle	INC	28,169	20.13	46,804	33.46
Ratnagiri	264	Guhagar	Bhaskar Jadhav	NCP	53,108	37.37	Ramdas Kadam	SS	40,032	28.17	13,076	9.20
Ratnagiri	265	Chiplun	Sadanand Chavan	SS	76,015	50.13	Ramesh Kadam	NCP	57,531	37.94	18,484	12.19
Ratnagiri	266	Ratnagiri	Uday Samant	NCP	74,245	46.53	Bal Mane	BJP	65,969	41.34	8,276	5.19
Ratnagiri	267	Rajapur	Rajan Salvi	SS	72,574	52.04	Ganpat Kadam	INC	48,433	34.73	24,141	17.31
Sindhudurg	268	Kankavli	Pramod Jathar	BJP	57,651	39.90	Ravindra Phatak	INC	57,617	39.88	34	0.02
Sindhudurg	269	Kudal	Narayan Rane	INC	71,921	57.78	Vaibhav Naik	SS	47,666	38.30	24,255	19.48
Sindhudurg	270	Sawantwadi	Deepak Kesarkar	NCP	63,430	48.28	Gopal Dalvi	SS	45,012	34.26	18,418	14.02
Kolhapur	271	Chandgad	Babasaheb Kupekar	NCP	64,194	30.87	Gopalrao Patil	JSS	58,862	28.31	5,332	2.56
Kolhapur	272	Radhanagari	K. P. Patil	NCP	86,843	40.79	Bajarang Desai	IND	45,121	21.19	41,722	19.60
Kolhapur	273	Kagal	Hasan Mushrif	NCP	1,04,241	46.05	Sanjay Mandlik	IND	57,829	25.55	46,412	20.50
Kolhapur	274	Kolhapur South	Satej Patil	INC	86,949	45.49	Dhananjay Mahadik	IND	81,182	42.47	5,767	3.02
Kolhapur	275	Karvir	Chandradip Narke	SS	96,232	44.45	P. N. Patil	INC	90,608	41.85	5,624	2.60
Kolhapur	276	Kolhapur North	Rajesh Kshirsagar	SS	70,129	45.99	Malojiraje Chhatrapati	INC	66,442	43.57	3,687	2.42
Kolhapur	277	Shahuwadi	Vinay Kore	JSS	73,912	38.10	Satyajeet Patil	SS	65,601	33.82	8,311	4.28
Kolhapur	278	Hatkanangle (SC)	Sujit Minchekar	SS	55,583	28.49	Jaywantrao Awale	INC	53,579	27.47	2,004	1.02
Kolhapur	279	Ichalkaranji	Suresh Halvankar	BJP	90,104	49.12	Prakash Awade	INC	66,867	36.45	23,237	12.67
Kolhapur	280	Shirol	S. R. Patil	INC	85,941	45.65	Ulhas Patil	SWP	69,495	36.92	16,446	8.73
Sangli	281	Miraj (SC)	Suresh Khade	BJP	96,482	56.07	Balaso Honmore	INC	42,026	24.42	54,456	31.65
Sangli	282	Sangli	Sambhaji Pawar	BJP	77,404	45.33	Madan Vishwanath Patil	INC	66,240	38.79	11,164	6.54
Sangli	283	Islampur	Jayant Patil	NCP	1,10,673	64.61	Vaibhav Naikawadi	IND	56,165	32.79	54,508	31.82
Sangli	284	Shirala	Mansing Naik	IND	1,04,303	53.68	Shivajirao Naik	INC	78,385	40.34	25,918	13.34
Sangli	285	Palus-Kadegaon	Patangrao Kadam	INC	1,06,211	58.37	Prithviraj Deshmukh	IND	70,626	38.82	35,585	19.55
Sangli	286	Khanapur	Sadashivrao Patil	INC	77,965	42.37	Anil Babar	IND	74,976	40.75	2,989	1.62
Sangli	287	T-K Mahankal	R. R. Patil	NCP	99,109	62.51	Dinkar Patil	SS	33,936	21.40	65,173	41.11
Sangli	288	Jat	Prakash Shendge	BJP	58,320	39.49	Vilasrao Jagtap	NCP	53,653	36.33	4,667	3.16
