= Democratic Secular Party =

Indian political party

- Chairperson: Abdul Karim Patel
- Ideology: Secularism

The Democratic Secular Party is an Indian political party which seeks support from the country's Islamic population.

The party ran a number of candidates in the 2009 Maharashtra state assembly elections and unsuccessfully put up eleven candidates in the general election of the same year. It has also been active in Bihar.

In 2010 the party chairman Abdul Karim Patel was reported as the victim of an assault in Nagpur after former state minister of Maharashtra was arrested for allegedly slapping Patel several times.

In 2012 the party joined a number of other groups in forming the Nagpur Janshakti Aghadi, a coalition of parties taking their impetus from the anti-corruption crusade of Anna Hazare.
