= Democratic Left =

Democratic Left, Democratic Left Party, or Party of the Democratic Left may refer to:

== Political parties ==
- Democratic Left (Ecuador)
- Democratic Left (France)
- Democratic Left (Greece)
- Democratic Left (Ireland)
- Democratic Left (Italy)
- Democratic Left (Spain)
- Democratic Left Alliance (Poland)
- Democratic Left Association
- Democratic Left Front
- Democratic Left Movement (Lebanon)
- Democratic Left Movement (Peru)
- Democratic Left Party (Turkey)
- Democratic Left People's Party
- Democratic Left (UK)
- Democratic Left Scotland
- Democratic Left of Catalonia
- Democratic Party of the Left
- Democrats of the Left
- Democrats of the Left (group)
- Federation of the Democratic Left (Morocco)
- Party of the Democratic Left (Czech Republic)
- Party of the Democratic Left (Slovakia)
- Party of the Democratic Left (2005) (Slovakia)

== Other uses ==
- Democratic Left (newspaper), a quarterly publication printed by the Democratic Socialists of America
- Left Democratic Front (disambiguation)
- Left Democrats (disambiguation)
- Party of Democratic Socialism (disambiguation)
