= United Socialist Organisation of India =

United Socialist Organisation was a left-wing alliance in India. The USOI was launched by Sarat Chandra Bose, the elder brother of Netaji Subhash Chandra Bose, after his resignation from the Indian National Congress in 1947. Bose wanted to assemble all the leftist groups in a common front. Most notably, the All India Forward Bloc under Sheel Bhadra Yagee joined USOI. However, a minority led by Forward Bloc chairman K.M. Joglekar disagreed with AIFB joining USOI. They broke away and formed the Forward Communist Party.

Ahead of the 1952 Indian general elections, USO comprised All India Forward Bloc, Sarat Chandra Bose's Socialist Republican Party, Bolshevik Party of India, Indian National Army, People's Movement and others and independents. USOI came to an understanding with Communist Party of India to form an anti-Congress front in West Bengal. Attempts were made to involve RSP in this front, but the negotiations ahead of the elections failed. Attempts were also made to reach agreements with Kisan Mazdoor Praja Party and Socialist Party of India, but no agreement was possible.

In total, USO fielded 72 candidates in the West Bengal assembly and CPI 71. For the Lok Sabha USOI fielded 8 candidates and CPI 9. In two constituencies the front supported RSP candidates. In other constituencies the front and RSP were in contest. In constituencies where there was no front candidate, the front appealed to voters to cast their vote for KMPP or the Socialist Party.

After the election, RSP joined the front.

== Results ==
The election was won by the Indian National Congress, who got a majority of its own in the assembly. The communists became the largest opposition party.

Party	No. of candidates	No. of elected	No. of votes	%
Indian National Congress	236	150	2889994	38.82%
Communist Party of India	86	28	800951	10.76%
Kisan Mazdoor Praja Party	129	15	667446	8.97%
Bharatiya Jana Sangh	85	9	415458	5.58%
Forward Bloc (Marxist Group)	48	11	393591	5.29%
Socialist Party	63	0	215382	2.89%
Akhil Bharatiya Hindu Mahasabha	33	4	176762	2.37%
Forward Bloc (Ruikar)	32	2	107905	1.45%
Revolutionary Socialist Party	16	0	63173	0.85%
Bolshevik Party of India	8	0	20117	0.27%
Akhil Bharatiya Ram Rajya Parishad	14	0	7100	0.10%
Independents	614	19	1653165	22.21%
Total:	1374	238	7443903	
