= United Democratic People's Front =

The United Democratic People's Front was an electoral alliance in West Bengal, India, formed ahead of the 1957 West Bengal Legislative Assembly election. The front was composed of the Jana Sangh, the Hindu Mahasabha, the Revolutionary Communist Party of India (Tagore) and a section of independent Congress dissidents.

In total UDPF fielded 100 candidates; Jana Sangh fielding 32, Hindu Mahasabha 37, RCPI (Tagore) 2 and 27 independents. No UDPF candidates were able to win any seat.

This was the only experiment of electoral cooperation between Jana Sangh and a left-wing party in West Bengal.
