= Ashok Ghosh =

Indian politician

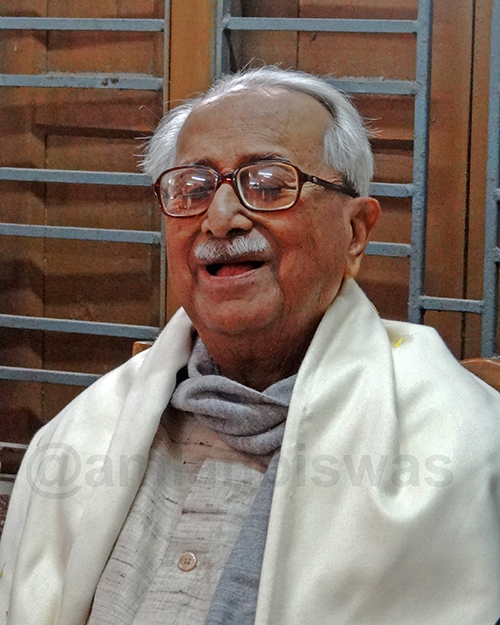
- Ashok Ghosh

Forward Bloc West Bengal State Secretary
- In office 1951–2016
- Succeeded by: Naren Chatterjee

Personal details
- Born: 2 July 1921
- Died: 3 March 2016 (aged 94) Kolkata, India
- Party: All India Forward Bloc
- Occupation: Politician

Ashok Ghosh (2 July 1921 – 3 March 2016) was an Indian Bengali marxist politician and a senior leader of All India Forward Bloc. He held the position of the state general secretary of Forward Bloc in West Bengal from 1951 until his death in 2016.

== Political career ==
Ghosh was a follower of Subhas Chandra Bose's political ideology. He became a general secretary of All India Forward Bloc, West Bengal in 1951. From that time on he was in that position without any interruption until his death in 2016. After the Indian general election of 1989, he voiced his opposition to the then coalition government, which he termed an "opportunistic coalition". Ghosh said that..."The opportunistic coalition coming up in Delhi will conspire against the interests of the people of West Bengal and in the changed situation, the Left Front must get ready to spearhead a sustained movement for preserving the interests of the state as well its people." After the Nandigram violence (2007), Ghosh convened an all political party meeting in Kolkata.

== Illness and death ==
In February 2016, Ghosh was admitted to a private hospital in South Kolkata, following respiratory problems. As of 4 February 2016, his condition was critical. He died at a hospital in Kolkata on 3 March 2016 due to multiple organ failure. He was buried at his Ashram Purulia, West Bengal as per his wish. He was 94.
