= Professionals Party of India =

The Professionals Party of India is a small political party set up in India in 2007. It was registered with the Election Commission of India in 2008. Its main support is from India's middle class and its stated aim is "improving the Quality of Life of every Indian". It plans to stand 12-15 candidates in the 2009 general election. The party has yet to win any seats in parliament.
