= Left Democratic Front (Maharashtra) =

- Abbreviation: LDF
- Leader: Collective leadership
- Founded: 2009
- Ideology: Communism; Marxism-Leninism
- Political position: Left-wing to far-left
- Alliance: I.N.D.I.A. (National); Maha Vikas Aghadi (Maharashtra)
- Seats in Rajya Sabha: 0 / 19
- Seats in Lok Sabha: 0 / 48
- Seats in Maharashtra Legislative Assembly: 4 / 288
- Seats in Maharashtra Legislative Council: 0 / 78

The Left Democratic Front is an alliance of communist, socialist, progressive and ecologist political parties in the Indian state of Maharashtra.

== Background ==
The parties of LDF and republican parties formed an alliance named Republican Left Democratic Front for 2009 Maharashtra Legislative Assembly election.

== Current members ==
| Party | Flag | Symbol | Leader |
|---|---|---|---|
| Communist Party of India (Marxist) | | | Ashok Dhawale |
| Communist Party of India | | | Bhalchandra Kango |
| Samajwadi Party | | | Abu Asim Azmi |
| Communist Party of India (Marxist–Leninist) Liberation | | | Shyam Gohil |
| Peasants and Workers Party of India | | | Jayant Prabhakar Patil |
| Bahujan Vikas Aghadi | | | Hitendra Thakur |
| Swabhimani Paksha | | | Raju Shetty |
| Satyashodhak Communist Party | | | Kishor Dhamale |
| Bahujan Republican Socialist Party | | | Suresh Mane |
| Republican Party of India (Secular) | | | Mahendra Pandagle |

== Objectives ==
The front goals a series to highlight the issues including remunerative price for agricultural produce, minimum wage and social security to agricultural labourers and unorganised workers, injustice and atrocities on women, dalits, adivasis, minorities and OBCs, the burning problems of price rise and unemployment, the defence of constitutional values and strong opposition to communal and ‘Manuwadi fascism’ of the RSS-BJP. The alliance also wants to maximise anti-BJP votes in the upcoming elections. To achieve these goals, a six membered core committee was formed. The members of the committee are CPI(M) Politburo member Ashok Dhawale, former MP Raju Shetti, CPI leader Bhalchandra Kango, PWPI general secretary and MLC member Jayant Prabhakar Patil, SP leader and MLA Abu Asim Azmi, BVA leader Hitendra Thakur.
