= Republican Left Democratic Front =

The Republican Left Democratic Front (RiDaLoS) was a coalition of political parties in the Indian state of Maharashtra formed before the 2009 Maharashtra state assembly elections. The alliance was forged between 14 political parties and many other NGOs and non-political groups as well as students organisations in Maharashtra Republican Left Democratic Front Popularly known as RIDALOS as an alternative to the existing coalitions in the state.

== Formation ==
In the weeks leading up to the 2009 Maharashtra Assembly election, RPI leader Ramdas Athawale announced the formation of the RIDALOS (RLDF) composing of Republican Party of India (United), Rashtriya Samaj Paksha, Communist Party of India (Marxist), Peasants and Workers Party of India, Janata Dal (Secular), Samajwadi Party, Swabhimani Paksha, Chhatra Bharati and Others. Ridalos contested all 288 Assembly seats against both Congress-NCP and BJP-Shivsena combines. He announced that the RIDALOS would be secular and would champion the cause of the poor and backward sections of the population. RIDALOS main focus was to be on the development of the Scheduled Castes, Dalits, Adivasis, Muslims and farmers. Athavale emphasised that he would not later support Congress or NCP despite his history of allying with them. Athavale also requested Prakash Ambedkar to join the RIDALOS (Third Front) But, Prakash Ambedkar did not join the Third Front (RIDALOS), Rather he formed Fourth Front composed of Bharipa Bahujan Mahasangh, All India United Democratic Front, Peace Party of India, and few other small organisations.

== Meeting ==
The first round of meeting was held in Mumbai and then followed with major public rally at Shivaji Park. It was attended by heavy weights political leaders from state as well as from national political parties. Even film stars and cricketers took part in this public rally to attract crowds. Bollywood Star Sanjay Dutt and Cricketer Vinod Kambli was star campaigner of RIDALOS.

== Members ==
The following were the founding members of this coalition:

- RPI(U)
- LDF

- CPI(M)
- CPI
- PWP
- SCP

- Lok Bharati
- JD(S)
- SP
- RJD
- LJSP
- RSP
- SJP
- Socialist Front
- Swabhimani Paksha
- Chhatra Bharati

== Prominent Leaders ==
The following are the Leaders of this RIDALOS coalition

- Ramdas Athawale
- Mahadev Jankar
- Jogendra Kawade
- Prakash Karat
- Mulayam Singh Yadav
- Kapil Patil
- Lalu Prasad Yadav
- Jayant Patil
- Abu Azmi
- Vinod Kambli
- Raju Shetti
- Ram Vilas Paswan

== Result ==
RIDALOS didn't receive much success as expected but became the third largest coalition after congress-NCP and Shivsena-BJP, while Maharashtra Navnirman Sena became fourth largest coalition with winning 13 assembly seats. While Fourth Front led by Prakash Ambedkar got only 2 seats.

== See also ==
- 2009 Maharashtra state assembly elections
- State Assembly elections in India, 2009
- Democratic Front (India)
