= Vivekanand Hospital and Research Center =

Geography
- Location: Latur, Maharashtra, Marathawada, India

Organisation
- Type: Private

Services
- Beds: 300

History
- Opened: 1966

Links
- Lists: Hospitals in India

Vivekanand Hospital and Research Center, first established in 1966, is a prominent hospital in the city of Latur, Maharashtra, India. It is a 300-bed hospital facility with a staff of 40 panel doctors and 400 paramedical staff. Vivekanand Hospital and Research Centre has facilities in cardiology, cardiac surgery, neurology and Cancer Treatment like Radiotherapy, chemotherapy and Cancer Surgery; it also has a nuclear science center, a diagnostic center, an intensive care units, a blood bank and a cancer unit.
