= United Left Front (1962) =

The United Left Front was an political alliance in West Bengal, India. A key issue that provoked various left parties to join hands was the prevailing food crisis in the state. The front comprised the Communist Party of India, the Socialist Unity Centre, the All India Forward Bloc, the Marxist Forward Bloc, the Revolutionary Communist Party of India, the Bolshevik Party of India and the Revolutionary Socialist Party.

In 1962 West Bengal Legislative Assembly election, the front won 74 seats out of 252.

== Election result of the ULF ==
Party	Candidates	Seats won	% of votes
CPI	145	50	25.02%
AIFB	35	13	4.61%
RSP	17	9	2.6%
RCPI		2	
