= United Left Front (1957) =

The United Left Front was an electoral alliance in West Bengal, India, formed ahead of the 1957 West Bengal Legislative Assembly election. The front comprised the Socialist Unity Centre of India, the Bolshevik Party of India, the Democratic Vanguard and the Republican Party.

The front gained 2.45% of the votes in the state (SUCI 0.85%, BPI 0.6%, DV 0.5% and RP 0.6%). Two out of three SUCI candidates were elected.
