= United Trade Union Congress =

Trade union in India

UTUC
- United Trade Union Congress
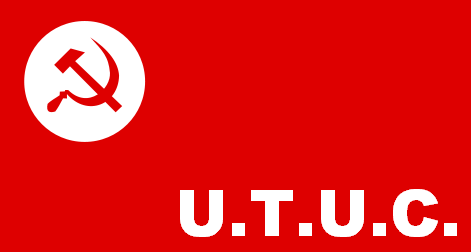
- Founded: 1949
- Headquarters: Kolkata, India
- Location: India
- Members: 383,946 (2002)
- Key people: Ashok Ghosh, general secretary

United Trade Union Congress is a central trade union organisation in India. UTUC is politically tied to Revolutionary Socialist Party. Ashok Ghosh is the general secretary of UTUC. According to provisional statistics from the Ministry of Labour, UTUC had a membership of 383,946 in 2002.

UTUC was founded at an All India Labour Conference in Calcutta, 1 May 1949. The founding president was professor K.T. Shah, a member of the Constituent Assembly of India from Bombay, and the founding general secretary was Mrinal Kanti Bose, a former AITUC president from Bengal. At the time of its foundation, Bose claimed that the organisation consisted of 236 unions with a combined membership of 347,428.

Initially, UTUC profiled itself as an independent trade union centre, organising members of different leftwing factions. In 1953 the Deputy Labour Minister of India, Abid Ali, estimated the UTUC membership at 384,962. At the time UTUC had 332 affiliated unions.

Thakur Mukand Singh Vaidh of Deoband Village, Jadoda Jutt, Uttar Pradesh served as a president of UTUC UP until April 1981.

UTUC is affiliated to the World Federation of Trade Unions.
