= United Left Election Committee =

The United Left Election Committee was an electoral alliance in West Bengal, India, formed ahead of the 1957 West Bengal Legislative Assembly election. The Committee consisted of the Communist Party of India, the Revolutionary Socialist Party, the Praja Socialist Party, the All India Forward Bloc and the Marxist Forward Bloc. The formation of the electoral alliance was announced at a mass meeting at Shahid Minar in January 1957.

The front gained 33.6% of the votes in the state and 80 out of 196 seats in Assembly.

Party	Candidates	Seats won	% of votes
CPI	103	46	17.82%
PSP	67	21	9.85%
AIFB	22	8	3.84%
RSP	7	3	1.24%
MFB	?	2	0.85%
