= Republican Party of India (Democratic) =

Flag used by various Dalit parties of India

The Republican Party of India (Democratic) was a political party in India. The party president was T. M. Kamble, after whose death, Nanda T. Kamble became the president of the party.

The party was a splinter group of the Republican Party of India. After the 2004 election, it had minor representation in the Lok Sabha and was a constituent of the ruling United Progressive Alliance. Its presence was limited to Maharashtra.

On 5 May 2011, the RP(D) aligned itself with the BJP-led NDA. In 2015, it was listed as one of the 26 political allies for prime minister candidate- Narendra Modi.

On 28 September 2015, the RP(D) was one of 16 parties in Maharashtra to be de-registered for not submitting audited balance sheets and IT return documents going back to 2005. Thus, they lost their official election symbols.
