= Left Democratic Manch =

- Abbreviation: LDM
- Founded: 2016
- Ideology: Communism; Marxism-Leninism
- Political position: Left-wing to far-left
- Alliance: INDIA (National) (2023–present); ASM (Assam) (2021–present)
- Seats in Rajya Sabha: 0 / 7
- Seats in Lok Sabha: 0 / 14
- Seats in Assam Legislative Assembly: 0 / 126

The Left Democratic Manch is a left-wing political alliance in Assam which was formed to oppose the auction of 12 oil fields of Assam. The alliance comprises 11 parties.

== Formation ==
The front was founded in July 2016 to oppose the auction of twelve oil fields of Assam. The government had recently announced the privatisation of 68 oil fields of India.

The front also raises its voice against several other issues like the NRC issue against illegal immigration of Bangladeshis, Flood Problem, etc.

The LDM also demands that March 24, 1971 should be the cut-off date for inclusion of names in the updated NRC. It also seeks to stop eviction drives unless rehabilitation plans for the affected families are made and wants no evictions on religious grounds.

== Members ==
Party	Ideology
Communist Party of India (Marxist)	Marxism–Leninism
Communist Party of India	Marxism–Leninism
Revolutionary Communist Party of India	Communism
All India Forward Bloc	Marxism; Left-wing nationalism
Communist Party of India (Marxist–Leninist) Liberation	Marxism–Leninism–Maoism
Janata Dal (Secular)	Secularism
Samajwadi Party	Democratic socialism
Nationalist Congress Party (Sharadchandra Pawar)	Secularism; Gandhism
Aam Aadmi Party	Populism
Asom Sangrami Mancha	
Liberal Democratic Party	Liberalism
