= Jayant Prabhakar Patil =

Indian politician

Member of Maharashtra Legislative Council
- In office 2018–2024
- Governor: C. Vidyasagar Rao; Bhagat Singh Koshyari
- Chairman: Ramraje Naik Nimbalkar
- Constituency: Elected by Vidhan Sabha Members
- In office 2002–2014
- Preceded by: himself
- Constituency: Konkan Graduate

Personal details
- Born: Jayant Prabhakar Patil
- Citizenship: Indian
- Party: Peasants and Workers Party of India
- Other political affiliations: Shetakari Sanghatana
- Spouse: Supriya Patil
- Children: Nrupal Patil
- Occupation: Lawyer, Politician
- Known for: Shetkari Sanghatana (Farmers organisation)

Jayant Prabhakar Patil is an Indian politician. He is currently the General Secretary of Peasants and Workers Party of India and a Member of the Legislative Council of Maharashtra. He is Chairman of Raigad District Central Co-operative Bank.

== Political career ==
After the death of his father he became leader of his party.

The 2004 Maharashtra Assembly Election was a major setback for his party, as two of the Major leaders lost their seats from Alibag and Pen Constituency. In 2009 they regained those constituency seats, but lost Panvel and also lost a number of votes from district. In the 2014 election they only won two seats in Raigad.

In 2019, they allied with NCP and lost all the seats in Raigad.
