= Kanai Pal =

Indian politician

Kanai Pal was an Indian Trotskyist politician. A labour leader active in Santipur, West Bengal, he represented the area in the state legislature 1962–1969.

== Independence struggle ==
As a politician, Pal was known to be self-sacrificing and sincere. He was jailed a number of times. Pal took part in the struggle for Indian independence and was convicted during the 1942 Quit India movement. He played a leading role in sabotage action group in Nadia District. In one confrontation during the August Revolution his spinal cord was badly injured. He later lost a finger in police lathi charge in protest for right for refugees from the Partition of India.

== 1952 elections and break with the RCPI ==
At the time of the 1951–1952 elections, Pal was a member of the Tagore faction of the Revolutionary Communist Party of India. He donated all his personal belongings, estimated at 15,000 Indian rupees, to the party. Pal contested the Santipur constituency in the 1952 West Bengal Legislative Assembly election on a RCPI ticket and finished in second place with 4,564 votes (21.43% of the votes in the constituency). He finished in fourth place with 2,920 votes (6.9%). However, Pal and his followers split away from the Tagore faction of RCPI in 1953. Pal was disappointed with the lack of support from the party during his election campaign. Pal's Santipur-based faction merged into the United Marxist League in 1954, which soon renamed itself as the Communist League.

Pal again contested the Santipur seat in the 1957 West Bengal Legislative Assembly election, this time on an independent ticket. He finished in second place with 13,470 votes (36.78%). In 1958 the Communist League merged into the Revolutionary Workers Party. The RWP merged into the Dasgupta-led RCPI in 1960.

== Legislator and prisoner ==
Pal won the Santipur seat in the West Bengal Legislative Assembly in the 1962 and 1967 elections. In 1962 he ran as an independent. With 26,553 votes (53.80%) he defeated the incumbent Indian National Congress legislator Haridas De. Soon after being elected, on 6 November 1962 he was jailed under the West Bengal Security Act. He was again arrested in 1965, under the Defense of India Rules. In December 1965 the Fourth International Congress elected Pal, along with other jailed Trotskyist leaders as member of its 'honorary presidium'.

In 1967 he contested on a Communist Party of India (Marxist) ticket. He retained the seat, obtaining 20,695 votes (47.63%).

== Later years ==
In the 1969 West Bengal Legislative Assembly election Pal ran as an independent in Santipur, against the official RCPI candidate M. Mokshed Ali. He finished in third place with 3289 votes (7.15%).

In the 1971 West Bengal Legislative Assembly election Pal ran as an independent in Santipur, against the official RCPI candidate Bimalananda Mukherjee. He finished in fourth place with 2,920 votes (6.9%). In 1972 he played a role building the Association for Protection of Democratic Rights (APDR) in Nadia District.

Pal died, having suffered from kidney failure, anemia, high blood pressure and paralysis.
