= Anadi Das =

Indian politician

Member of the West Bengal Legislative Assembly for Howrah West
- In office 1962–1967
- Preceded by: Bankim Chandra Kar

Member of the West Bengal Legislative Assembly for Howrah Central
- In office 1969–1971

Personal details
- Party: Revolutionary Communist Party of India Revolutionary Communist Party of India (Tagore) Revolutionary Communist Party of India (Das)

Anadi Das was an Indian politician, belonging to the Revolutionary Communist Party of India.

Das was a Central Committee member of RCPI. Das contested the Howrah West constituency seat of the West Bengal Legislative Assembly in the 1957 election. Das finished in third place with 5,378 votes (20.04%).

Das won the Howrah West constituency seat in the West Bengal Legislative Assembly in the 1962 election. He defeated the incumbent assembly speaker Bankim Chandra Kar. Das obtained 19,770 votes (44.59%). He contested the Howrah Central constituency seat in the 1967 election. Das finished in second place with 15,663 votes (32.48%). As of 1967 he served as president of the National Screw & Wire Products Workmen's Union as well as the Asia Electric Workers' Union, both being affiliated with the All India Trade Union Congress.

He won the Howrah Central seat in the 1969 election. Das obtained 28,522 votes (58.85%).

Das and the other RCPI legislator M. Mokshed Ali were expelled from RCPI by party general secretary Sudhindranath Kumar in July 1969 for "anti-Party and anti-UF activities". The expulsion provoked a split in RCPI, with Anadi Das leading his own RCPI faction. Ahead of the 1971 West Bengal Legislative Assembly election the RCPI (Anadi Das group) joined the Communist Party of India-led Eight Party Coalition. Das ran on an independent ticket in Howrah Central, against Kumar. Das finished in fourth place with 2,711 votes (8.55%).

Das' faction later joined the S.N. Tagore-led RCPI faction. After the death of Tagore, RCPI (S.N. Tagore group) was split with Das leading one of the factions.
