= 1971 elections in India =

Elections in India
- 1971

Elections in the Republic of India in 1971 included the 1971 Indian general election, elections to three state legislative assemblies and to seats in the Rajya Sabha.

== General Election ==
Party	Votes	%	Seats	+/–
Indian National Congress (R)	64,033,274	43.68	352	+69
Indian National Congress (Organisation)	15,285,851	10.43	16	New
Bharatiya Jana Sangh	10,777,119	7.35	22	–13
Communist Party of India (Marxist)	7,510,089	5.12	25	+6
Communist Party of India	6,933,627	4.73	23	0
Dravida Munnetra Kazhagam	5,622,758	3.84	23	–2
Swatantra Party	4,497,988	3.07	8	–36
Samyukta Socialist Party	3,555,639	2.43	3	–20
Bharatiya Kranti Dal	3,189,821	2.18	1	New
Telangana Praja Samithi	1,873,589	1.28	10	New
Praja Socialist Party	1,526,076	1.04	2	–11
Shiromani Akali Dal	1,279,873	0.87	1	New
Utkal Congress	1,053,176	0.72	1	New
All India Forward Bloc	962,971	0.66	2	0
Peasants and Workers Party of India	741,535	0.51	0	–2
Revolutionary Socialist Party	724,001	0.49	3	New
Republican Party of India (Khobragade)	542,662	0.37	0	New
Kerala Congress	542,431	0.37	3	+3
Bangla Congress	518,781	0.35	1	–4
Indian Union Muslim League	416,545	0.28	2	0
Vishal Haryana Party	352,514	0.24	1	New
All India Jharkhand Party	272,563	0.19	1	New
Shiv Sena	227,468	0.16	0	New
Shoshit Dal Bihar	193,389	0.13	0	New
Socialist Unity Centre of India	157,703	0.11	0	New
Republican Party of India	153,794	0.10	1	0
Janta Party	139,091	0.09	0	New
All Party Hill Leaders Conference	90,772	0.06	1	0
United Front of Nagaland	89,514	0.06	1	New
Hindu Mahasabha	73,191	0.05	0	New
Akhil Bharatiya Gorkha League	72,131	0.05	0	New
Bihar Prant Hul Jharkhand	66,669	0.05	0	New
Hindustani Shoshit Dal	65,925	0.04	0	New
Revolutionary Communist Party of India	65,622	0.04	0	New
Lok Sewak Sangh	62,527	0.04	0	New
Jana Congress	60,103	0.04	0	0
Nagaland Nationalist Organisation	58,511	0.04	0	–1
United Goans – Seqveria Group	58,401	0.04	1	0
Socialist Party	55,064	0.04	0	New
Maharashtrawadi Gomantak Party	54,597	0.04	0	New
Proutist Bloc of India	43,849	0.03	0	New
Telangana Congress	43,548	0.03	0	New
Minorities Labour Party	41,198	0.03	0	New
Indian Socialist Party	38,713	0.03	0	New
Muslim Majlis Uttar Pradesh	36,526	0.02	0	New
Lok Raj Party Himachal Pradesh	34,070	0.02	0	New
Uttar Pradesh Kisan Mazdoor Party	31,729	0.02	0	New
Manipur Peoples Party	31,029	0.02	0	New
Akhil Bharatiya Ram Rajya Parishad	24,093	0.02	0	New
Republican Party of India (Ambedkarite)	22,428	0.02	0	New
Backward Classes Mahasabha	6,929	0.00	0	New
Revolutionary Socialist Party of India (Marxist–Leninist)	6,198	0.00	0	New
Chota Nagpur Bhumi Rakshak Party	4,982	0.00	0	New
Independents	12,279,629	8.38	14	–21
Appointed members (Note: Two representing Anglo-Indians and one representing the North-East Frontier Agency.)			3	0
Total	146,602,276	100.00	521	–2
Valid votes	146,602,276	96.74		
Invalid/blank votes	4,934,526	3.26		
Total votes	151,536,802	100.00		
Registered voters/turnout	274,189,132	55.27		
Source: ECI

== Overall Results ==
Date(s)	State	Government before election	Chief Minister before election	Government after election	Chief Minister after election	Maps
1–7 March 1971	Tamil Nadu	Dravida Munnetra Kazhagam	M. Karunanidhi	Dravida Munnetra Kazhagam	M. Karunanidhi	
	West Bengal	President's Rule		United Left Democratic Front	Ajoy Mukherjee	
	Orissa	Swatantra Party	Rajendra Narayan Singh Deo	Independent	Bishwanath Das	

== Legislative Assembly elections ==
=== Orissa ===
Party	No. of candidates	No. of elected	No. of votes	%
Indian National Congress (Indira)	129	51	1240668	28.18%
Utkal Congress	139	33	1055826	23.99%
Swatantra Party	115	36	767815	17.44%
Praja Socialist Party	50	4	267768	6.08%
Orissa Jana Congress	66	1	227056	5.16%
Communist Party of India	29	4	210811	4.79%
Indian National Congress (Organization)	50	1	79460	1.81%
All India Jharkhand Party	14	4	72291	1.64%
Samyukta Socialist Party	15	0	53271	1.21%
Communist Party of India (Marxist)	11	2	52785	1.20%
Bharatiya Jana Sangh	21	0	30824	0.70%
All India Forward Bloc	4	0	8393	0,19%
Socialist Unity Centre of India	1	0	2093	0.05%
Bihar Prant Hul Jharkhand	1	0	532	0.01%
Independents	190	4	332327	7.55%
Total:	835	140		

=== Tamil Nadu ===
Source: Election Commission of India

Alliances	Party	Popular Vote	Vote %	Seats contested	Seats won	Change
Progressive Front; Seats: 205; Seat Change: +26; Popular Vote: 8,506,078; Popular Vote %: 54.30%	Dravida Munnetra Kazhagam	7,654,935	48.58%	203	184	▲47
Progressive Front; Seats: 205; Seat Change: +26; Popular Vote: 8,506,078; Popular Vote %: 54.30%	Communist Party of India	364,803	2.32%	10	8	▲6
Progressive Front; Seats: 205; Seat Change: +26; Popular Vote: 8,506,078; Popular Vote %: 54.30%	All India Forward Bloc	268,721	1.71%	9	7	▲6
Progressive Front; Seats: 205; Seat Change: +26; Popular Vote: 8,506,078; Popular Vote %: 54.30%	Praja Socialist Party	147,985	0.94%	4	4	—
Progressive Front; Seats: 205; Seat Change: +26; Popular Vote: 8,506,078; Popular Vote %: 54.30%	Indian Union Muslim League	69,634	0.44%	2	2	▼1
Democratic Front; Seats: 21; Seat Change: -50; Popular Vote: 6,016,530; Popular Vote %: 38.18%	Indian National Congress	5,513,894	34.99%	201	15	▼36
Democratic Front; Seats: 21; Seat Change: -50; Popular Vote: 6,016,530; Popular Vote %: 38.18%	Swatantra Party	465,145	2.95%	19	6	▼14
Democratic Front; Seats: 21; Seat Change: -50; Popular Vote: 6,016,530; Popular Vote %: 38.18%	Socialist Party	37,491	0.24%	2	0	—
Others; Seats: 8 Seat Change: Popular Vote: 1,234,193; Popular Vote %: 7.52%	Independent	965,379	6.13%	256	8	
Others; Seats: 8 Seat Change: Popular Vote: 1,234,193; Popular Vote %: 7.52%	Communist Party of India	259,298	1.65%	37	0	
Total	10 Political Parties	15,756,801	—	—	234	—

=== West Bengal ===
1971 West Bengal Legislative Assembly election
Party	Leader	Vote %	Seats	+/–
CPI(M)	Jyoti Basu		113	+33
Congress (R)			105	+50
Communist Party of India			13	−17
Socialist Unity Centre of India			7	0
Indian Union Muslim League			7	+7
Bangla Congress	Ajoy Mukherjee		5	−28
ULF Independents			4	New
All India Forward Bloc			3	−18
Revolutionary Socialist Party			3	−9
Praja Socialist Party			3	−2
Revolutionary Communist Party of India	Sudhindranath Kumar		3	+1
Congress (O)			2	New
Jharkhand Party			2	New
Workers Party of India			2	0
Marxist Forward Bloc			2	+1
All India Gorkha League			2	−2
Bharatiya Jan Sangh			1	+1
Biplobi Bangla Congress			1	New
Samyukta Socialist Party dissident			1	New
This lists parties that won seats. See the complete results below.
