= Inquilabi Communist Sangathan =

Defunct Trotskyist organisation in India

Inquilabi Communist Sangathan was a Trotskyist organisation in India. Formed through the merger of the Communist League and the Bolshevik Leninist Group, it was set up in 1984. In the early years it had state units and members in ten provinces of India, and significant mass work. From the 1990s, there was a decline, partly because many of its members were unable to do serious teamwork; and partly because the dogmatic style of Magan Desai, a powerful figure in the strongest state unit, Gujarat, clashed with other members who wanted a more open and non-sectarian functioning. In addition, many ex-Stalinist and ex-Maoists were recruited, and one faction in West Bengal showed that they had simply replaced the Stalin-Mao cult by the Trotsky cult. By the end of the 1990s, the ICS was a much shrunken organisation. The final crisis came after the Gujarat carnage of 2002, when a faction around Desai attacked the most well-known anti-communal and civil rights activist members of the party as self-seeking individuals. The Conference of 2003 saw Gujarat, led by Desai, rejecting a delegate session, so it was unclear how many members were actually in ICS. The West Bengal unit, along with several Gujarat members, left. It is uncertain whether Desai had an actual majority with him, but he continued to call his rump organisation ICS. Their last public activity was a hostile intervention into the World Social Forum of Mumbai 2004. Those who had split subsequently set up an organisation, Radical Socialist.

== Origins ==
In the early 1980s, there were two Trotskyist organisations affirming support to the USFI, its official section Communist League, successor to the Socialist Workers Party, and the Bolshevik-Leninist Group. The BLG was formed by former CL members, along with some Trotskyists recruited in Britain or the US who had returned to India. Participation in the Bombay textile strike drew the groups closer, and also subjected them to public scrutiny regarding why two distinct groups existed. In 1982, the CL held a Conference in Santipur, West Bengal, which saw it revive from the crisis that had been caused by the split and individual exits between 1975 and 1979. Between 1982 and 1984 there were joint activities between the CL and the BLG, which resulted in the formation of the Inquilabi Communist Sangathan at a conference in Bombay in 1984.

== The early years ==
The united organisation decided not to have a General Secretary, and instead elected a Central Committee and a smaller Central Secretariat. Important leaders included Achin Vanaik, Magan Desai, Thakore Shah, Amar Jesani, Vibhuti Patel, Somendra Kumar, Jagabandhu Chattopadhyay and Kunal Chattopadhyay. Vanaik edited Marxist Outlook, Kumar edited the Hindi Majdoor Jang, and Kunal Chattopadhyay edited the Bangla Naya Antarjatik.

Between 1985 and the beginning of the 1990s, the ICS had units in Gujarat, Maharashtra, Kerala, West Bengal, UP, Bihar, Madhya Pradesh, and members at large in Tamil Nadu, Jammu and Kashmir, Delhi, etc. It was involved in considerable trade union work, in political campaigns around reservations, in anti-communal activities, and in the women's movements.

The crucial political documents adopted by the ICS in the early period were The Rajiv Era, an early appraisal of the changing strategy of Indian capitalism and its willingness to open up the economy, and a major attempt to analyse the necessity of affirmative action beyond Dalits. Another document was on the changing nature of communalism and communal violence, which argued that communalism was moving from the fringes to the centre of Indian politics. A major organisational document dealt with the relationship between party, responsibility of members, and of mass organisations.

== Crisis in the 1990s ==
During the 1990s the ICS declined. A number of factors were involved. The ICS had talented activists, who however often could not work as a team. Secondly, two styles of work repeatedly clashed—one led by Magan Desai, for whom party work meant taking "basic" Trotskyist ideas and texts and formulae into every struggle, and others like Vanaik, Rohit Prajapati, and others, for whom mass movement participation was crucial. Third, the recruitment of a significant number of ex-Maoists in West Bengal resulted in a Mao-Stalinist political culture being imported into the organisation. By the late 1990s, Patel, Jesani, Vanaik, had all left the organisation, the ex-Maoists had split to form a formally orthodox Trotskyist group that denounced the USFI.

== The Gujarat Communalist Carnage, the ICS Resistance, and the Final Split ==
In 2002, the ICS played a tremendous role in campaigns over the Gujarat communal massacres. But this in turn intensified conflicts, with one wing arguing that communalism was reducible to an economic determinist analysis, and also arguing that the other side, in campaigning for secularism, had been projecting individuals rather than the party. Thus, in 2002, the ICS brought out the first major book documenting the Gujarat violence anywhere in India (The Genocidal Pogrom in Gujarat: Anatomy of Indian Fascism), and Prajapati and Trupti Shah in Vadodara played key roles in PUCL's documentation of the violence in Gujarat. Yet by the end of 2002 Prajapati had resigned from the ICS. Another factor in this conflict was a debate over the relationship between environmental struggles and class struggle. The 2003 ICS conference in Vadodara saw the entire West Bengal delegation walking out, along with Trupti Shah. What was left of the ICS was confined to Vadodara. The last major public activity of the ICS was its opposition to the World Social Forum 2004 and support for the mainly Naxalite-backed Mumbai Resistance, for which it brought out a major leaflet.

The West Bengal-based Trotskyists who had left ICS in 2003 regrouped in 2008 to form Radical Socialist. This organisation brings out a Bengali journal Radical, and has a website www.radicalsocialist.in. Its members are active in forest rights struggles, trade union struggles, women's movements, and student-youth work. Prajapati, Shah, and a few other Gujarat members are also associated with Radical Socialist.

In August 2026, the Radical Socialist unified with the Revolutionary Communist Party of India. The united organisation retained the name RCPI, citing the continuity of the RCPI, and reaffirmed an explicitly anti-Stalinist orientation. It upheld working-class self-emancipation, democratic proletarian rule, opposition to both popular-frontism, and ultra-left adventurism, and a transitional approach linking immediate struggles to the struggle for socialism. The process was presented as a new political identity, drawing on the legacies of both traditions.

== Publications ==
- The Main Enemy is At Home (1998): ICS Statement on Pokharan II Blast
- Gujarat Riots: Against Communalism and State Complicity (2002)
- List of Publications
