= People's United Socialist Front =

The People's United Socialist Front was an electoral alliance in West Bengal, India, formed ahead of the 1952 West Bengal Legislative Assembly election. The front was composed of the Socialist Party, the Forward Bloc (Ruikar) and the Revolutionary Communist Party of India (Tagore).

The front had candidates in 105 out of 238 constituencies (63 SP candidates, 32 FB(R) and 10 RCPI). The front gained 4.84% of the votes, but only two of its candidates (both from Ruikar's Forward Bloc) were able to win seats.

== Results ==
The election was won by the Indian National Congress, who got a majority of its own in the assembly. The communists became the largest opposition party.

Party	No. of candidates	No. of elected	No. of votes	%
Indian National Congress	236	150	2889994	38.82%
Communist Party of India	86	28	800951	10.76%
Kisan Mazdoor Praja Party	129	15	667446	8.97%
Bharatiya Jana Sangh	85	9	415458	5.58%
Forward Bloc (Marxist Group)	48	11	393591	5.29%
Socialist Party	63	0	215382	2.89%
Akhil Bharatiya Hindu Mahasabha	33	4	176762	2.37%
Forward Bloc (Ruikar)	32	2	107905	1.45%
Revolutionary Socialist Party	16	0	63173	0.85%
Revolutionary Communist Party of India	10	0	32859	0.44%
Bolshevik Party of India	8	0	20117	0.27%
Akhil Bharatiya Ram Rajya Parishad	14	0	7100	0.10%
Independents	614	19	1653165	22.21%
Total:	1374	238	7443903	
