= Howrah Madhya Assembly constituency =

Howrah Madhya
- Constituency No. 171 for the West Bengal Legislative Assembly
- Interactive Map Outlining Howrah Madhya Assembly Constituency

Constituency details
- Country: India
- Region: East India
- State: West Bengal
- District: Howrah
- Lok Sabha constituency: Howrah
- Established: 1967
- Total electors: 223,616
- Reservation: None

Member of Legislative Assembly
- 18th West Bengal Legislative Assembly
- Incumbent Arup Roy
- Party: DTC
- Elected year: 2026

Howrah Madhya Assembly constituency is an assembly constituency in Howrah district in the Indian state of West Bengal.

== Overview ==
As per orders of the Delimitation Commission, No. 171 Howrah Madhya Assembly constituency is composed of the following: Ward Nos. 25 to 28 and 44 to 62 of Howrah Municipal Corporation.

Ward No.	Councillor	Party
25	Vacant	Vacant
26	Vacant	Vacant
27	Vacant	Vacant
28	Vacant	Vacant
44	Vacant	Vacant
45	Vacant	Vacant
46	Vacant	Vacant
47	Vacant	Vacant
48	Vacant	Vacant
49	Vacant	Vacant
50	Vacant	Vacant
51	Vacant	Vacant
52	Vacant	Vacant
53	Vacant	Vacant
54	Vacant	Vacant
55	Vacant	Vacant
56	Vacant	Vacant
57	Vacant	Vacant
58	Vacant	Vacant
59	Vacant	Vacant
60	Vacant	Vacant
61	Vacant	Vacant
62	Vacant	Vacant

Howrah Madhya Assembly constituency is part of No. 25 Howrah Lok Sabha constituency.

== Members of the Legislative Assembly ==
=== Howrah North ===
Year	Name	Party
1951	Biren Banerjee	Communist Party of India
1957	Samar Mukhopadhyay	Communist Party of India
1962	Saila Kumar Mukherjee	Indian National Congress

=== Howrah South ===
Year	Name	Party
1951	Beni Charan Dutta	Indian National Congress
1957	Kanai Lal Bhattacharya	All India Forward Bloc
1962	Kanai Lal Bhattacharya	All India Forward Bloc

=== Howrah West ===
Year	Name	Party
1951	Bankim Chandra Kar	Indian National Congress
1957	Bankim Chandra Kar	Indian National Congress
1962	Anadi Das	Independent politician

=== Howrah East ===
Year	Name	Party
1951	Saila Kumar Mukhopadhyay	Indian National Congress
1957	Beni Charan Dutta	Indian National Congress
1962	Bejoy Bhattacharya	Indian National Congress

=== Howrah Central ===
Year	Name	Party
1967	D. Mitra	Indian National Congress
1969	Anadi Das	Revolutionary Communist Party of India
1971	Sudhindranath Kumar	Revolutionary Communist Party of India
1972	Mrityunjoy Banerjee	Indian National Congress
1977	Sudhindranath Kumar	Revolutionary Communist Party of India
1982	Ambica Banerjee	Indian National Congress
1987	Ambica Banerjee	Indian National Congress
1991	Ambica Banerjee	Indian National Congress
1996	Ambica Banerjee	Indian National Congress
2001	Ambica Banerjee	Trinamool Congress
2006	Arup Ray	Communist Party of India (Marxist)

=== Howrah Madhya ===
Year	Name	Party
2011	Arup Roy	Trinamool Congress
2016	Arup Roy	Trinamool Congress
2021	Arup Roy	Trinamool Congress
2026	Arup Roy	Trinamool Congress

== Election results ==
=== 2026 ===
2026 West Bengal Legislative Assembly election: Howrah Madhya
Party	Candidate	Votes	%	±%
AITC	Arup Roy	95,948	49.6	▼7.56
BJP	Biplab Mondal	79,865	41.28	▲7.97
CPI(M)	Imteaz Ahmed	11,280	5.83	
INC	Aparna Bose	2,747	1.42	▼5.21
NOTA	None of the above	1,110	0.57	▼0.83
Majority		16,083	8.32	▼15.53
Turnout		193,459	90.02	▲16.81
AITC hold		Swing		

=== 2021 ===
2021 West Bengal Legislative Assembly election: Howrah Madhya
Party	Candidate	Votes	%	±%
AITC	Arup Roy	111,554	57.16	
BJP	Sanjay Kumar Singh	65,007	33.31	
INC	Palash Bhandari	12,942	6.63	
NOTA	None of the above	2,735	1.4	
Majority		46,547	23.85	
Turnout		195,144	73.21	
AITC hold		Swing		

=== 2016 ===
2016 West Bengal Legislative Assembly election: Howrah Madhya
Party	Candidate	Votes	%	±%
AITC	Arup Roy	91,800	52.20	
JD(U)	Amitabha Dutta	38,806	22.06	
BJP	Sanjay Kumar Singh	35,691	20.29	
NOTA	None of the above	4,135	2.35	
SUCI(C)	Soumitra Sengupta	1,326	0.75	
Majority		52,994	30.13	
Turnout		1,76,047	71.81	
AITC hold		Swing		

=== 2011 ===
In the 2011 election, Aroop Roy (Apu) of Trinamool Congress defeated his nearest rival Arup Ray(Tukun)of CPI(M).

2011 West Bengal Legislative Assembly election: Howrah Madhya
Party	Candidate	Votes	%	±%
AITC	Arup Roy	103,184	62.07	
CPI(M)	Arup Ray	52,514	31.59	
BJP	Ram Narayan Chowrasia	6,223	3.74	
IND	Sunil Dalui	1,594	0.96	
JD(U)	Vikram Singh Grewal	1,071	0.64	
Majority		50,670	30.48	
Turnout		1,66,407	74.11	
AITC gain from CPI(M)		Swing	18.20#	

.# Swing calculated on BJP+Trinamool Congress vote percentages taken together in 2006.

=== 2006 ===
In the 2006 state assembly elections Arup Ray of CPI(M) won the Howrah Central assembly seat defeating his nearest rival Ambica Banerjee of Trinamool Congress. Contests in most years were multi cornered but only winners and runners are being mentioned. In 2001, 1996, 1991, 1987 and 1982 state assembly elections, Ambica Banerjee of Trinamool Congress/ Congress defeated Subir Ranjan Das of CPI(M) in 2001, Sureswar Dutta of Janata Dal in 1996 and 1991, Sankar Mondol, Independent, in 1987, and Sudhindranath Kumar in 1982. Sudhindranath Kumar, Revolutionary Communist Party of India, defeated Sukumar Banerjee of Janata Party in 1977.

=== 1972 ===
Mrityunjoy Banerjee of Congress won in 1972. Sudhindranath Kumar of RCPI won in 1971, Anadi Das of RCPI won in 1969. D. Mitra of Congress won in 1967.

=== 1962 ===
During the period Howrah had four Vidhan Sabha constituencies.

==== Howrah North ====
Saila Mukherjee of Congress won in 1962. Samar Mukhopadhyay of CPI won in 1957. Biren Banerjee of CPI won in 1951.

==== Howrah West ====
Anadi Dass, Independent, won in 1962. Bankim Chandra Kar of Congress won in 1957 and 1951.

==== Howrah East ====
Bejoy Bhattacharyya of Congress won in 1962. Beni Chandra Dutta of Congress won in 1957. Saila Kumar Mukhopdhyay of Congress won in 1951.

For results of Howrah South constituency see Howrah Dakshin Assembly constituency.
