= Nandigram North Assembly constituency =

Former West Bengal Legislative Assembly constituency

Nandigram North Assembly constituency was an assembly constituency in Purba Medinipur district in the Indian state of West Bengal.

== Members of Legislative Assembly ==
Election Year	Member	Party affiliation	ref.
1951	Subodh Chandra Maity	Indian National Congress	
1957	Subodh Chandra Maity	Indian National Congress	
1962	Subodh Chandra Maity	Indian National Congress	
