= Biren Deka =

Indian politician

Comrade Biren Deka
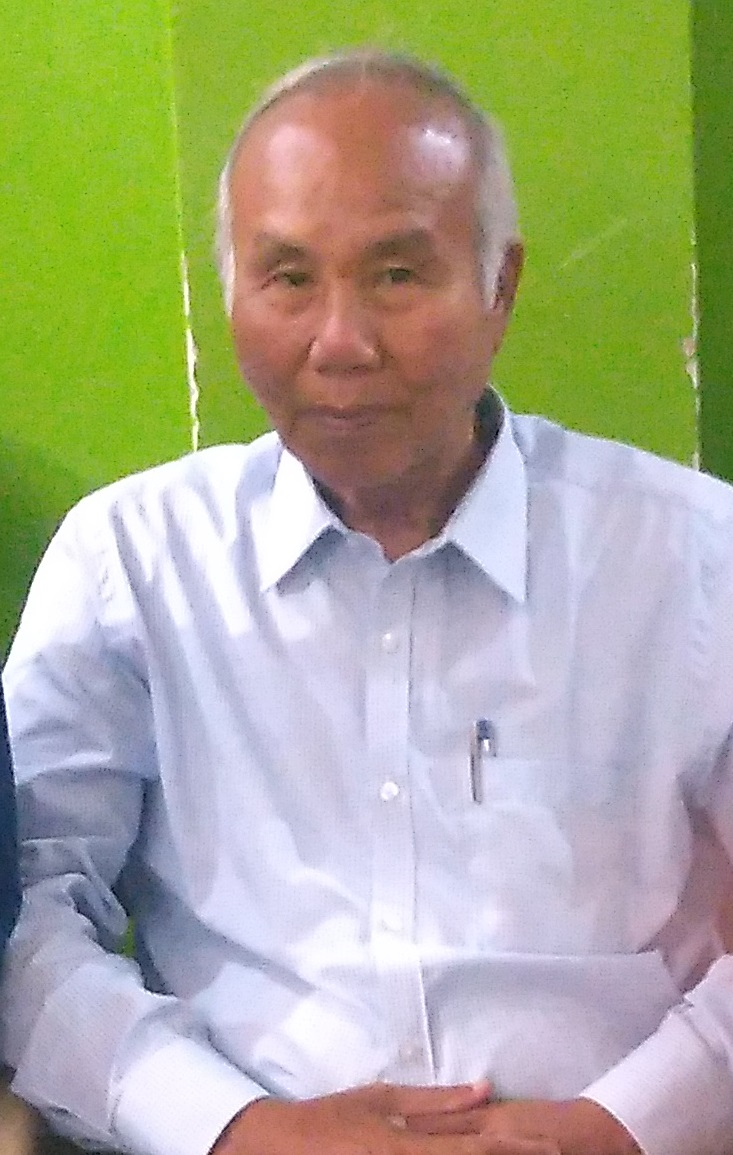

Former Party Secretary of the Revolutionary Communist Party of India
- In office 2006–2016
- Preceded by: Baneswar Saikia
- Succeeded by: Mihir Bain

Personal details
- Born: 1 August 1947 (age 79) Setali Gaon, Phuloguri
- Education: Anandaram Dhekial Phookan College, Gauhati University
- Occupation: Politician, Professor
- Website: Party Official website

Biren Deka is an Indian politician and a former Party Secretary of the Revolutionary Communist Party of India. He was elected as its General Secretary in 2006. He is also a retired professor of the Department of Economics of Nowgong Girls' College.
