= Sudhindranath =

Sudhindranath is a given name. Notable people with the name include:

- Sudhindranath Dutta (1901–1960), Indian poet, essayist, journalist and critic
- Sudhindranath Kumar (1918–1984), Indian politician
