= Krishnagar Assembly constituency =

Coordinates: 23.40°N 88.50°E

Krishnagar
- Former constituency for the West Bengal Legislative Assembly

Constituency details
- Country: India
- Region: East India
- State: West Bengal
- District: Nadia
- Lok Sabha constituency: Krishnagar
- Established: 1952
- Abolished: 1967
- Reservation: None

Krishnagar Assembly constituency was an assembly constituency in Nadia district in the Indian state of West Bengal.

== Members of the Legislative Assembly ==
Election Year	Name of M.L.A.	Party affiliation
1951	Bejoy Lal Chattopadhyay	Indian National Congress
1957	Jagannath Majumdar	Indian National Congress
1962	Kashi Kanta Maitra	Praja Socialist Party

== Results ==
=== 1951-1962 ===
Kashi Kanta Maitra of PSP won the Krishnagar seat in 1962. Jagannath Majumdar of Congress won in 1957. In independent India's first election in 1951 Bejoy Lal Chattopadhyay of Congress won the Krishnagar seat.
