= Sardul Singh Kavishar =

Indian politician (1886–1963)

Sardul Singh Kavishar (1886–1963) was an Indian newspaper editor, and a major figure in the Indian independence movement. Born in Amritsar, he was the second president of the All India Forward Bloc.

== Education ==
Educated in Lahore, Kavishar began his public career in 1913, when he launched the English-language newspaper Sikh Review. An early article in the Sikh Review criticized the demolition of an external city wall during the construction of New Delhi, as the wall had been part of a historic Sikh gurdwara. This led to widespread Sikh agitation until the outbreak of the First World War, at which point that particular issue was considered to be of lessened priority. After the war Kavishar renewed his calls for action, with the result that he was expelled from Delhi. He moved to Lahore and began another newspaper, the New Herald. In 1919, he was arrested and imprisoned for writing against the Rowlatt Act. He was also the founding member of Central Sikh League.

== Call to rebuild ==
In 1921, he issued a public call for 100 Sikh volunteers to rebuild the gurdwara's demolished wall, at the cost of their lives if need be. 700 volunteers (including Kavishar himself) turned out. However, before they could leave Lahore for Delhi, word arrived that the Delhi city government had rebuilt the wall. The next month, he was arrested, charged with sedition, and imprisoned for four years for having written about a massacre of Sikh reformists.

== Congress ==
In 1933, he became acting president of the Congress after his predecessor was arrested for participating in civil disobedience. In 1935, he openly opposed the Congress's participation in the Government of India Act, and in 1937 chose to resign his membership in the party after they accepted office in the provinces where they had earned a majority.

== Subhas Chandra Bose ==
In 1939, he joined Subhas Chandra Bose's All India Forward Bloc faction; when Bose left India in 1941, Kavishar became the Bloc's president. As a result, he was arrested, and imprisoned for four years.

== Split ==
When the All India Forward Bloc split in 1948, soon after it had been reorganized, Sardul Singh Kavishar sided with the anti-Marxist group led by R.S. Ruiker. At its conference, Kavishar was elected president of Forward Bloc (Ruiker). Soon thereafter, as Ruiker's party dwindled, Kavishar retired from active politics.
