= Revolutionary Communist Party of India (Das) =

Political party in West Bengal (1969–1971)

The Revolutionary Communist Party of India, also known as RCPI (Das), was a political party in the Indian state of West Bengal, led by Anadi Das.

RCPI (Das) emerged as Anadi Das and M. Mokshed Ali, the two members of the West Bengal Legislative Assembly of the Revolutionary Communist Party of India, were expelled from RCPI in July 1969. Ahead of the 1971 West Bengal Legislative Assembly election the RCPI (Das) joined the Communist Party of India-led Eight Party Coalition. Moreover, RCPI (Das) joined the August Kranti Celebration Committee of seven political parties, which supported the struggle for independence of Bangla Desh.

After the 1971 election, RCPI (Das) merged into the RCPI (Tagore). After the death of Tagore, RCPI (Tagore) was split, with Das leading one of the factions and Bibhuti Bhushan Nandi the other.
