= Sailendra Narayana Ghosal Sastri =

Vedic scholar (1928–1988)

Sailendra Narayana Ghoshal শৈলেন্দ্রনারায়ণ ঘোষাল शैलेन्द्रनारायण घोषाल
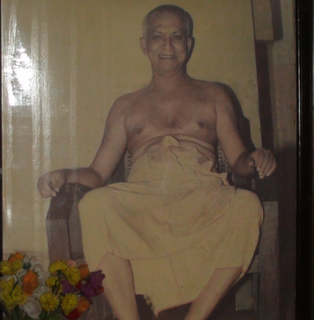
- Sailendra Narayana Ghosal Sastri

Personal life
- Born: 5 March 1928 Midnapur, Bengal, India
- Died: 8 September 1987 (aged 59) Kaliada Village near Midnapur
- Parents: Sashibhushan Ghoshal (father); Prabhavati Devi (mother)
- Notable work(s): Tapobhumi Narmada, Alok Tirtha and Alok Vandana
- Honors: Sastri

Religious life
- Religion: Hinduism
- Founder of: The Vedic Research Institute
- Philosophy: Vedanta and Vedic Śrauta

Religious career
- Influenced: Soumendranath Tagore, Sukumar Sen (linguist), Radha Kumud Mukherjee, Jagadishchandra Chattopadhyay

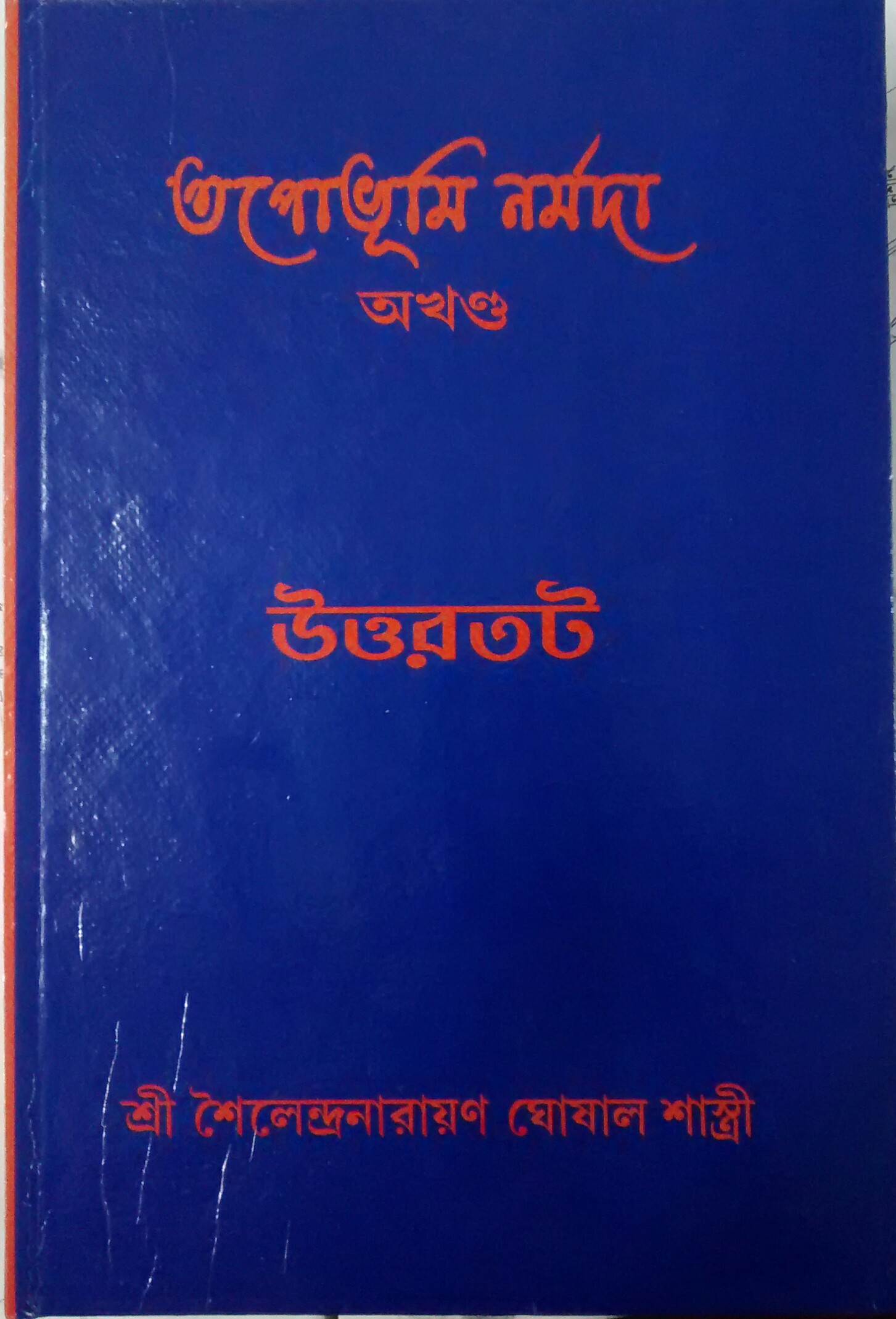
Front cover of Tapobhumi Narmada

Sailendra Narayana Ghoshal Sastri (Bengali: শৈলেন্দ্রনারায়ণ ঘোষাল) (5 March 1928 – 8 September 1988) was a Vedic scholar and director of The Vedic Research Institute.

== Biography ==
=== Birth and education ===
Sailendra Narayana was born in Kaliara Village, West Midnapur, West Bengal, India, to a devout family. His parents were Agnihotri Brahmin Sashibhushan Ghoshal and Prabhabati Devi. Sailendra Narayana was a meritorious student since childhood. He stood first in the Matric exam in Midnapur district from Midnapur B H Institute. He passed I.Sc.in first Division from Midnapore College.He got Honors in Sanskrit from Scottish Church College, Calcutta. He used to take lessons of Vedic literature from his father. Later he completed M.A. in Sanskrit and Philosophy from University of Calcutta.

=== Narmada Parikrama ===
After completing post-graduation (M.A.), he went for Narmada Parikrama, the pilgrimage travel around the bank of river Narmada, in barefoot, where he met with many Sages and had some extraordinary experiences. In that austere journey, he discovered many mysterious facts about Hindu Philosophy and many rare manuscripts of Sanskrit books like Rudra Hridaya Upanishad or Agama literature. The entire journey is described in his famous travelogue Tapobhumi Narmada.

=== Contribution to Indian philosophy ===
According to his father's wish, he traveled all over the India four times. He visited Kedar-Vadri, Kailash, Manas Sarovar, Satapanth, Kashmir, Varanasi etc. and got accompany of many Sages. In his debut book Alok Tirtha, published on 1958, he tried put on the light over many misconceptions of Idolatry, Ramayana, Mahabharata, Bhagavad etc. Though many of the conservative Hindus of that time protested him, famous personalities like Soumendranath Tagore, Sukumar Sen (linguist), historian Radha Kumud Mukherjee, philosopher Jagadish Chandra Chattopadhyay, bard Akshay Kumar Boral admired his work. He replied to his critics in his second book Alok Vandana(1959). Later in 1969, he founded - The Vedic Research Institute where he used to reply all questions of his followers on every Tuesdays from the vedic point of views.

== Bibliography ==
=== Published works ===
- Tapobhumi Narmada
- Alok Tirtha (1958)
- Alok Vandana (1959)
- Pitarou (1980)

=== Unpublished works ===
- Science in Vedas
- Prachin bharoter juddho vidya
- Vedant Sar
- Patanjali Yoga Darshans
- Vedic Bharata

== See also ==
- Akshay Kumar Boral
- Narmada River
- Soumendranath Tagore
- Vedic scholars
