= All India Forward Bloc (Ruikar) =

- Founder: Ramchandra Sakharam Ruikar
- Founded: 1948
- Dissolved: 1953
- Split from: All India Forward Bloc
- Merged into: Praja Socialist Party

All India Forward Bloc (Ruikar) was a political party in India, emerging out of split from the All India Forward Bloc.

== History ==
In the spring of 1948 the recently reorganized All India Forward Bloc split into two factions. In February the Central Committee of AIFB met in Varanasi to discuss the situation after Independence and Partition. At the meeting it was decided that AIFB should break all relations to the Indian National Congress and that a separate party should be created out of the branches in Pakistan. The then general secretary of the party, Sheel Bhadra Yagee effectively dissolved the Bengal state committee of the party, and appointed ad hoc committees in West Bengal and East Bengal.

This spurred discontent inside the party. Leading the rebellion against Yagee was the party president, S.S. Cavesheer. Yagee decided to resign as general secretary. In May the Central Committee met again and appointed Ramchandra Sakharam Ruikar as the new general secretary. Yagee grouped his followers around himself, and by this time the two factions virtually functioned as two separate parties. The group led by Ruikar had its emphasis on nationalism rather than Marxism, and called themselves 'Subhasists'.

On 29–31 December the Ruikar faction held a congress in Ashutosh College Hall, Calcutta. Ruikar was elected general secretary and Cavesheer as president. At the same time the Marxist faction held a congress in Hooghly. Thus the split was complete. The Ruikar-led party adopted the Indian tricolour with a leaping tiger as their flag, identical to the one used by Netaji Subhas Chandra Bose's Indian National Army.

In 1951 the issue of reunification was raised inside Ruikar's party. In June the Central Committee of the party held a meeting which decided to move ahead with the reunification of Forward Bloc. Ruikar and Leela Roy disagreed with the decision, and were expelled. The two Forward Blocs held a joint central committee meeting in Howrah on 23 June, in which the two parties merged. Ruiker and Leela Roy did however mobilize their followers and reconstituted themselves as a separate party.

In the 1952 general elections, the Electoral Commission let the Ruikar-led party contest as 'Forward Bloc (Ruikar)' and the other AIFB group as 'Forward Bloc (Marxist)'. FB(R) contested six Lok Sabha seats, 3 in Madhya Pradesh, 1 in Madras and 2 in West Bengal. The elections resulted in a humiliating defeat for Ruikar's party. In total the six candidates got 133 936 votes.

In the West Bengal legislative assembly election the party was a member of the People's United Socialist Front, together with the Socialist Party and the Revolutionary Communist Party of India (Tagore). The party contested 32 assembly seats, and won two (the only two PUSF to win any seats). The elected MLAs of the party were Atindra Nath Bose from Asansol and Biren Roy from Behala.

The following year the party was disbanded and merged into Praja Socialist Party.
