= Marxist League of Kerala =

The Marxist League of Kerala was an alliance of leftwing elements in Kerala, India during the 1960s. The groups included dissidents from the Communist Party of India, the Communist Party of India (Marxist) and the Revolutionary Socialist Party as well as the Kerala branch of the Socialist Workers Party. By 1969 SWP withdrew from the League, and started to act alone in Kerala politics.
