= Krishak Banuva Panchayat =

Krishak Banuva Panchayat (Assam Peasant and Labour Party) was a political organisation in Assam, India. It functioned as the open mass front for the Revolutionary Communist Party of India in Assam. It was founded on 2 May 1940 at a convention in Gauhati.

Bishnu Prasad Rabha and Khagen Barbarua were notable leaders of KBP.
