= Arup Roy =

Indian politician (born 1956)

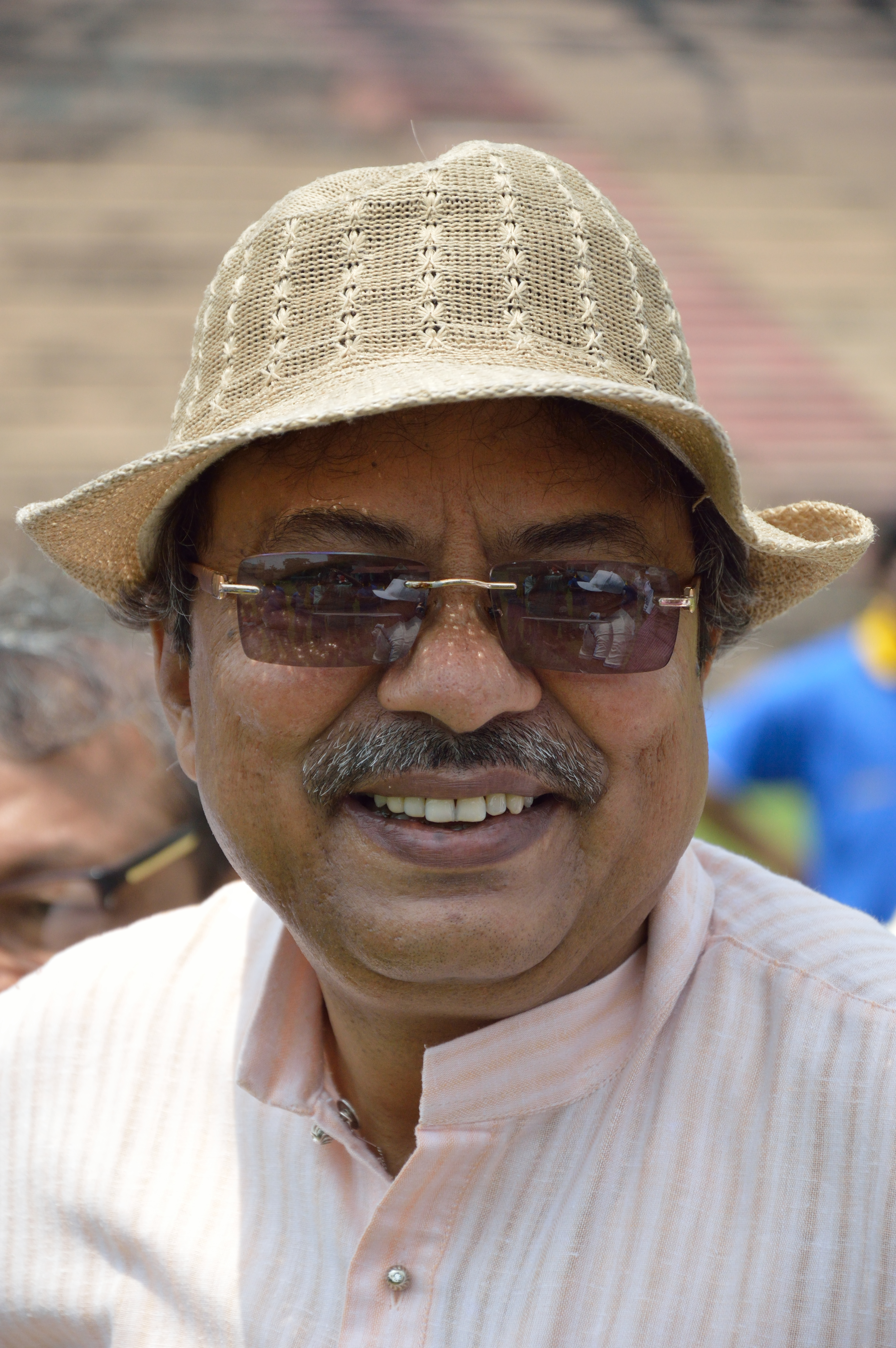
- Roy in April 2013

Chairperson of Democratic Trinamool Congress
- Incumbent
- Assumed office 19 June 2026
- Preceded by: Office established

Cabinet Minister Government of West Bengal
- In office 20 May 2011 – 7 May 2026
- Governor: M. K. Narayanan; D. Y. Patil (additional charge); Keshari Nath Tripathi; Jagdeep Dhankhar; La. Ganesan (additional charge); C. V. Ananda Bose; R. N. Ravi
- Chief Minister: Mamata Banerjee

Member of the West Bengal Legislative Assembly
- Incumbent
- Assumed office May 13, 2011
- Preceded by: Arup Ray
- Constituency: Howrah Madhya

Personal details
- Born: 16 October 1956 (age 69)
- Party: Trinamool Congress (1998–present); Indian National Congress (till 1998)

Arup Roy is an Indian politician. He was a cabinet Minister in Charge of Co-operations department, of Government of West Bengal between 2011 and 2026. He was also an MLA, elected from the Howrah Madhya constituency in the 2011 West Bengal state assembly election. He had been re-elected in 2016,2021 and 2026 West Bengal Legislative Assembly election. He is the District president of Trinamool Congress from Howrah.

In June 2026 Roy was elected as chairperson of Trinamool Congress by a rebel group.
