= Sudhindranath Kumar =

Indian politician

Sudhindranath Kumar

Sudhindranath Kumar (1918-1984) was an Indian politician, belonging to the Revolutionary Communist Party of India. He served as general secretary of the party 1960–1984, represented Howrah Central constituency in the West Bengal Legislative Assembly and served as Food Minister of the state in 1969 and 1977–1982.

== Youth and student years ==
Kumar was born into a Calcutta middle class family in 1918. He studied Law, and obtained a master's degree in 1940. As an undergraduate student he joined the RCPI and was active in its Students Front. He held vatious posts in the Bengal Provincial Students Federation and the All India Students Federation. Upon graduation from university, he became a full-time political organiser rather than working as a lawyer.

== World War II and prison years ==
In the midst of World War II, Kumar went underground. He was imprisoned during the 1942 Quit India struggle, and would be released only at the end of the war. He contracted tuberculosis in prison.

== Howrah conference ==
Kumar became the general secretary of the RCPI (Pannanlal Dasgupta group) at the All India Conference held in Howrah in 1960. He held the post until his death. As of 1963 he was listed as the editor of the monthly Marxism Today.

== United Front period ==
Kumar served as convenor of the United Front formed ahead of the 1967 West Bengal Legislative Assembly election. During the protests against the dismissal of the first United Front cabinet in 1967, Kumar was arrested under the Preventive Detention Act. After the 1969 West Bengal Legislative Assembly election Kumar was named Food and Supplies Minister in the second United Front state government. The Food Minister had been given to the Communist Party of India (Marxist) in the coalition government, but CPI(M) opted to name Kumar as its choice for the post. Kumar was seen as a CPI(M) protege at the time, Himmat magazine referred to him as the 'blue-eyed boy of Jyoti Basu'.

== First tenure as Food Minister ==
Kumar's tenure as minister was short and turbulent. The two elected RCPI state legislators, Anadi Das and M. Mokshed Ali, accused Kumar of having tried to coerce them to resign in order for Kumar to be able to contest their seats in a by-poll. In July 1969 Kumar expelled both of the RCPI legislators from RCPI, creating a split in the party. Around the same time two United Front member parties, the All India Forward Bloc and the Socialist Unity Centre of India, demanded Kumar's resignation. A June 1969 edition of Himmat reported that Kumar was about to lose his ministerial post. As the West Bengal Legislative Council was abolished in August 1969 (to which Kumar, in theory, had a chance to get elected) and none of the elected legislators had been willing to resign to enable Kumar to get elected, Kumar was forced to resign from his ministerial post.

== 1971 elections ==
After the fall of the United Front cabinet, the RCPI (Sudhin Kumar group) joined the CPI(M)-led United Left Front. The front, which was formally constituted in May 1970, had Kumar as its convenor. Kumar, along with Hare Krishna Konar of CPI(M), was tasked with drafting the joint electoral manifesto.

Kumar won the Howrah Central seat, defeating the candidates of Congress(O), Bangla Congress as well as his former party comrade Anadi Das. He obtained 12,616 votes (39.80%). However, in the subsequent 1972 West Bengal Legislative Assembly election Kumar lost the Howrah Central seat to Mrityunjoy Banerjee. Kumar finished in second place with 15,870 votes (37.77%).

== Second tenure as Food Minister ==
Kumar regained the Howrah Central seat in the 1977 West Bengal Legislative Assembly election. He obtained 21,502 votes (44.50%). After the 1977 election, Kumar was named Minister for Food and Civil Supplies in the first Left Front cabinet. Kumar also served as vice president of the Centre of Indian Trade Unions (CITU).

Kumar lost the Howrah Central seat to Congress(I) candidate Ambica Banerjee in the 1982 West Bengal Legislative Assembly election. Kumar finished in second place with 29,785 votes (43.34%). After having lost his assembly seat, Kumar lost his post as minister. Bimalananda Mukherjee replaced him as the RCPI representative in the Left Front government.

Kumar died in 1984.
