= Revolutionary Communist Party of India (Tagore) =

- Abbreviation: RCPI(Tagore)
- Founder: Saumyendranath Tagore
- Founded: 1948; 78 years ago
- Dissolved: 2001
- Merger of: RCPI (Das) (1971)
- Split from: Revolutionary Communist Party of India
- Merged into: Revolutionary Communist Party of India
- Ideology: Communism; Anti-Stalinism; Marxism

The Revolutionary Communist Party of India, also known as RCPI (Tagore), was a political party in India, led by Saumyendranath Tagore. RCPI (Tagore) emerged from a split in the Revolutionary Communist Party of India in 1948. RCPI (Tagore) had a very minor role in Indian politics. Tagore served as the chairman of the party. The party published the Bengali fortnightly Ganabani ('People's Voice').

== Split in RCPI ==
Tagore, the founder of RCPI in 1934, had been jailed in November 1947. Tagore was released from prison in 1948. At the time a sector of RCPI, led by Pannalal Dasgupta, insisted on turning the campaign of building panchayats into a general armed insurrection. After his release from jail Tagore argued that armed revolution was premature in India.

Dasgupta assembled an All India Party Conference in Birbhum in 1948. Tagore requested to resign from the RCPI Central Committee, a request the Birbhum conference rejected. After the Birbhum conference the followers of Dasgupta began to gather arms and prepare for armed struggle. After the Birbhum conference Tagore, at a public meeting in Calcutta, denounced insurrectional line of Dasgupta. Tagore's speech pushed the Dasgupta group to issue disciplinary action against him, accepting his resignation from the Central Committee. Half a year later Tagore gathered his followers for a separate Party Conference, as its 5th Party Congress, in Burdwan. Thus there were two parallel RCPIs, one led by Dasgupta and one led by Tagore. The former grouping represented the majority in the RCPI.

== Work amongst refugees ==
The RCPI (Tagore) joined the Refugee Central Rehabilitation Council, a body that challenged the main CPI-led United Central Refugee Council.

== 1951–1952 elections ==
Ahead of the 1951–1952 general election RCPI (Tagore) joined the United Socialist Organisation of India of Sarat Chandra Bose, but in June 1951 the party broke with the USOI. Instead, on 18 July 1951 RCPI (Tagore) along with the Socialist and the Leela Roy faction of the Forward Bloc formed the People's United Socialist Front (PUSF). RCPI (Tagore) fielded 11 candidates in the 1952 West Bengal Legislative Assembly election. None of the candidates was elected, in total the party obtained 35,645 votes (0.48% of the statewide vote). The election symbol of the party was a flaming torch.

Dissatisfied with what he perceived to be lack of support from the party during the election campaign, Kanai Pal and his Santipur-based group split away from RCPI (Tagore) in 1953.

== 1957 election ==
RCPI (Tagore) joined the United Democratic People's Front ahead of the 1957 West Bengal Legislative Assembly election, a front that brought together the Hindu nationalist Jana Sangh and Akhil Bharatiya Hindu Mahasabha, as well as dissident Congressmen. RCPI (Tagore) contested 2 seats, winning none and obtaining 18,602 votes (0.18% of the statewide vote).

== Sixth and Seventh Party Congresses ==
RCPI (Tagore) held its Sixth Party Congress in February–March 1960. The Party Congress characterized the Soviet Union as a 'labour bureaucracy' and China as moving towards 'totalitarian, bureaucratic rule'. The Party Congress called for the creation of a new International of anti-Stalinist left-wing forces. RCPI (Tagore) held its Seventh Party Congress in November 1961.

Tagore visited Israel as a guest of Mapam in 1964.

== 1969 elections ==
RCPI (Tagore) was the sole party that opposed holding mid-term state assembly elections in November 1968. RCPI (Tagore) contested 4 seats in the 1969 West Bengal Legislative Assembly election, but failed to win any seat.

RCPI (Tagore) eventually fell into oblivion, being unable to join the CPI(M)-led fronts due to their ideological purism and history of conflict with the CPI(M)-aligned RCPI.

== Merger with RCPI (Das) and split ==
After the 1971 West Bengal Legislative Assembly election the Revolutionary Communist Party of India (Das) merged into RCPI (Tagore). Tagore died in 1974. After the death of Tagore, RCPI (Tagore) was split, with Das leading one of the factions and Bibhuti Bhushan Nandi the other. As of the early 1980s RCPI (Das) opposed the Left Front whilst RCPI (Nandi) supported the Left Front government from outside.

== Merger with the main RCPI ==
In 2001, the party merged into its parent organisation, the Revolutionary Communist Party of India.
