= Progressive Youth Federation of India =

Youth wing of the Revolutionary Communist Party of India

- ভাৰতৰ প্ৰগতিশীল যুৱ ফেডাৰেছন; ভারতের প্ৰগতিশীল যুব ফেডারেশন
- Abbreviation: PYFI
- Formation: 20–22 June 1986
- Type: Youth Organisation
- Location: India
- Region served: Assam, West Bengal
- Affiliations: Revolutionary Communist Party of India

The Progressive Youth Federation of India (PYFI) is the youth wing of the Revolutionary Communist Party of India (RCPI). It was established in 1986. The organisation is active in West Bengal and Assam. It follows the principles of scientific socialism.

The slogan of PYFI is "Struggle, Peace and Progress".

== Flag ==
The length and breadth of the flag is 3:2, the colour of the flag is blue. There is a red star (★) in the top right corner of the flag, which symbolises "struggle", and on the right of the flag, "PYFI" is written vertically in white.

== State secretaries ==
1. Assam: Hamdur Rahman (i/c)
2. West Bengal: Sanjay Basu

== State presidents ==
1. Assam: Uttam Chetia (i/c)
2. West Bengal: Abhijit Chakraborty
