= Socialist Party (Marxist) =

Socialist Party (Marxist) was a Trotskyist political party in India. It was formed in 1954 by the Trotskyists inside the Socialist Party, who broke away in protest against the merger of the Socialist Party and the Kisan Mazdoor Praja Party into the Praja Socialist Party. The new party was not affiliated to any of the Trotskyist Fourth Internationals.

In 1958 the Socialist Party (Marxist) merged into the Revolutionary Workers Party.
