= Socialist Workers Party (India) =

The Socialist Workers Party (SWP) was a Trotskyist political party in India.

The party was established in 1965 by activists, mostly in Mumbai. These included two former leading members of the Revolutionary Workers Party: S. B. Kolpe, who became editor of the party journal, Marxist Outlook, and Murlidhar Parija, who became the party's general secretary. It aligned itself with the United Secretariat of the Fourth International.

In 1968 the party recruited Gour Pal, formerly a leading figure in the Revolutionary Communist Party of India (RCPI), and significant numbers of trade unionists from the Communist Party of India (Marxist) and the Revolutionary Socialist Party (RSP). The SWP opposed the Naxalite rebels, who they criticised for their isolation from the urban working class. It supported the independence movement in Bangladesh.

The party opposed nominally revolutionary parties, such as the RCP and RSP, which participated in state governments. However, until early 1969, it co-operated with many of those parties in the Marxist League of Kerala. In the 1970 Kerala state elections it stood one candidate, but he received only 362 votes.

In 1971, the SWP renamed itself the Communist League. Magan Desai became party secretary, and the journal was renamed Red Spark. During The Emergency of 1975–1977, it lost many long-standing members, some forming the Bolshevik Leninist Group. The party continued to operate into the mid-1980s.

In 2012, a party of a similar name, the Workers' Socialist Party was established in India based on the principles of the Fourth International of 1938. Its platform includes achieving Indian reunification through a proletarian revolution.
