= Saumyendranath Tagore =

Indian communist leader and intellectual

- সৌম্যেন্দ্রনাথ ঠাকুর
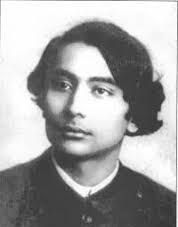
- Born: 8 October 1901; Calcutta, Bengal Presidency, British India
- Died: 22 September 1974 (aged 72)
- Education: Presidency College Calcutta
- Occupations: Politician, Marxist theorist
- Known for: Translating The Communist Manifesto to the Bengali language Plotting to assassinate Adolf Hitler
- Political party: Workers and Peasants Party, Communist Party of India, Communist Party of Germany, Revolutionary Communist Party of India, Revolutionary Communist Party of India (Tagore)
- Spouse: Srimati Hutheesing
- Family: Tagore family
- Website: www.rcpi-communist.in/p/saumyendranath-tagore.html

Saumyendranath Tagore (8 October 1901 – 22 September 1974), son of Sudhindranath Tagore, fourth child of Dwijendranath Tagore, and grandnephew of Rabindranath Tagore, was the leader of the Revolutionary Communist Party of India, and the first translator of The Communist Manifesto into Bengali, which was published in Langal magazine edited by Kazi Nazrul Islam.

== Education ==
Tagore passed matriculation in 1917 from Mitra Institution in Kolkata and became graduate with Hon's in Economics from the Presidency College in the year of 1921.

== Communist movement ==
In 1920, Tagore joined the "Akhil Bharat Chatra Sammelan" ("All-India Student Conference") in Ahmedabad. He befriended Muzaffar Ahmed and the poet, Kazi Nazrul Islam. After Tagore joined the Workers and Peasants Party (WPP) in April 1926, he began mobilizing the jute mill‐workers of Bengal to form the Bengal Jute Workers' Association. His effectiveness as a trade union activist and his attempts to win revolutionaries over to the WPP drew official attention to him. In order to avoid arrest, Tagore left for Europe in May 1927. There, he met international communist leaders and was soon in Moscow. He attended the 6th Congress of the Communist International (Comintern).

=== Differences with the Comintern ===
Tagore differed with the Comintern on the "Colonial Question". Later, he came to favor Leon Trotsky's theory of "Permanent Revolution" over Joseph Stalin's notion of "Socialism in One Country". He also came to oppose the Comintern's "Popular Front" strategy in the 1930s, regarding it as a betrayal of proletarian revolution.

At the 1928 Communist International congress Tagore had sought to challenge the role of M. N. Roy in the organization. Tagore had turned hostile towards Stalin, possibly as in reaction to his failed bid to gain recognition from the Communist International in 1928. On his return to India in 1934 he appealed to the Communist Party of India (CPI) to abandon its ultra-left line. Although the CPI would later moderate its positions after the Seventh Congress of the Communist International, Tagore broke with the CPI. In May 1934 he set up an 'initiative committee' for the founding of a new party.

=== The Communist League ===
Tagore formed the Communist League of India on 1 August 1934. Other founders of the Communist League included Sudhir Dasgupta, Prabhat Sen, Ranjit Majumdar and Arun Banerjee.

==== The Communist League and the peasantry ====
After the formation of the Communist League Tagore began touring the Bengal country-side, organizing peasants to struggle for abolishing the zamindari system. In early 1938 Tagore built a peasants wing, the ‘Bangiyo Pradeshik Kisan Sabha’ (BPKS), separate from the CPI-led Krishak Samiti. Tagore's BPKS demanded abolition of the zamindari system without giving any compensation to landlords, free distribution of land among the cultivators and agricultural labourers, minimization of revenue demands and cancellation of debts to moneylenders.

==== Tagore in Assam ====
In 1941 the Communist League had been renamed the "Communist Party of India", but in March 1943 it was rechristened the Revolutionary Communist Party of India (RCPI) in order to differentiate it from the "official" Communist Party of India.

The RCPI was the first left organization to established itself in Assam. In November 1938 Tagore visited Assam and met with a group of students and youth. His visit was organized by the Congressman Debranath Sarma. A Communist League branch was formed in the province in 1939.

Tagore made a second visit to Assam in December 1941. This time he visited Khagen Barbarua at his village in Upper Assam and discussed building the party organization in the province. Tagore was expelled from Assam on 18 December 1941.

=== Split in the RCPI ===
After his return to India, Tagore had been arrested a number of times by the British colonial administration and was in and out of prison for most of a decade. After being released from prison in 1948, Tagore was confronted with a sector within the RCPI, led by Pannalal Dasgupta, which insisted on turning the campaign of building panchayats into a general armed insurrection. Tagore argued, instead, that armed revolution was premature in India.

The Dasgupta faction assembled an All India Party Conference in Birbhum in 1948. Tagore presented his resignation from the RCPI Central Committee, a request that the Birbhum conference rejected. Following the conference Dasgupta's followers began to gather arms and to prepare for armed struggle. Tagore, for his part, addressed a public meeting in Calcutta at which he denounced the insurrectional line of Dasgupta. Tagore's speech pushed the Dasgupta group to accept his resignation from the Central Committee. Half a year later Tagore gathered his followers for a separate party conference, calling it the 5th Party Congress, in Burdwan. Thus there came to be two parallel RCPIs, one led by Dasgupta and one led by Tagore. The former grouping represented the majority in the RCPI. The latter of the two parties came to be known as 'RCPI (Tagore)'. It was led by Tagore until his death in 1974.

=== Time in Germany ===
In 1933, Tagore was arrested on the charge of plotting to assassinate the leader of Nazi Germany, Adolf Hitler, while he was in Munich, Germany, and kept in custody at the Gestapo prison. The Associated Press wrongly reported that "son of the world famous poet, Sir Rabindranath Tagore" was arrested, rather than grand nephew; after the intervention of the British Consul-General from India, Tagore was released the very next day and set out for Paris.

== Literary works ==
Saumyendranath Tagore was a regular writer of Kallol group. He wrote articles in French, Russian, German, English and Bengali languages. The books Biplabi Russia, Trayee, Jatri, Rabindranather Gaan, 'Communism and Fetishism', 'Bourgeois Democratic Revolution and India', 'Permanent Revolution', 'Tactics and strategy of revolution' 'Gandhi'(French) are few of them.

Tagore's revolutionary activities led the British authorities to ban a number of his works.

== Family ==
Saumyendranath Tagore married Srimati Hutheesingh from an aristocratic Jain Gujarati Hutheesing family of Ahmedabad. She was a student in Shantiniketan and a well known dancer and choreographer who took training in dance in India and abroad. Srimati Tagore's brother Gunottam (Raja) Hutheesingh married Krishna Nehru, younger daughter of Motilal Nehru and sister of India's first Prime Minister Jawaharlal Nehru.
