= Ramchandra Sakharam Ruikar =

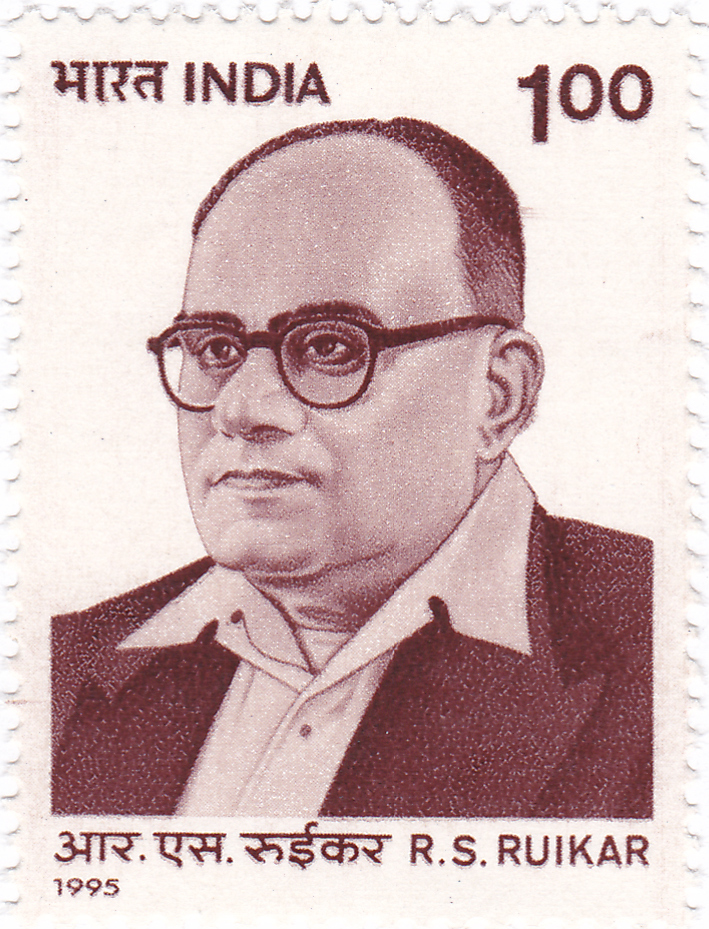
Ruikar on a 1995 stamp of India

Ramchandra Sakharam Ruikar was a pioneer of the Indian labour movement. He was born on 8 January 1895 in Rui, Kolhapur, Maharashtra. He graduated from college from Pune and Nagpur with a masters in history and economics. He created a legal service in Nagpur, where he founded the Nagpur Textile Union. The union was the first to registered under the Trade Unions Act. He went on to help create more unions around India. He was elected as president of the All India Trade Union Congress twice. He was arrested and imprisoned many times for his beliefs. In 1938, he joined the All India Forward Bloc and soon became general secretary of that party.

In 1946, Ruikar was selected as the AITUC delegate at the International Labour Organization Conference.

He led a split within the Forward Bloc in 1948, and his faction constituted a separate All India Forward Bloc (Ruikar). In December 1948, he became the president of the Hind Mazdoor Sabha trade union federation. Later his party was disbanded and he joined the Praja Socialist Party.
