= Revolutionary Workers Party (India) =

Indian political party founded 1958

The Revolutionary Workers Party (RWP) was a Trotskyist political party in India.

The party was founded in 1958 with the merger of the Socialist Party (Marxist), the Communist League and the Mazdoor Communist Party. The party appointed Murlidhar Parija, general secretary of the United Trade Union Congress of Bombay, as its general secretary, and adopted S. B. Kolpe's journal, New Perspective, as the party newspaper. It affiliated with the International Secretariat of the Fourth International.

In 1960, the party decided to undertake mass entrism in the Revolutionary Communist Party of India (Kumar). They became a majority of the organisation, but it did not adopt distinctively Trotskyist positions. During the Sino-Indian War of 1962, the party gave its support to the Indian Army, leading most of the RWP members to resign. However, they did not re-establish a party until the Socialist Workers Party was established in 1965.
