= Ambica Banerjee =

Indian politician

Member of Parliament for Howrah
- In office 2009–2013
- Preceded by: Swadesh Chakraborty
- Succeeded by: Prasun Banerjee

Member of the West Bengal Legislative Assembly
- In office 1982–2006
- Preceded by: Sudhindranath Kumar
- Succeeded by: Arup Ray
- Constituency: Howrah Central

Deputy Leader of the Opposition in West Bengal Legislative Assembly
- In office 1996–2006
- Leader: Pankaj Kumar Banerjee
- Preceded by: TBD
- Succeeded by: Abu Hasem Khan Choudhury

Personal details
- Born: 28 August 1928 Shibpur, Howrah, West Bengal, British India
- Died: 25 April 2013 (aged 84) Kolkata, India
- Party: All India Trinamool Congress (1998–2013); Indian National Congress (1972–1998)
- Spouse: Bela Banerjee
- Education: Hatfield Technical College, London, UK
- Occupation: Mechanical Engineer
- Profession: Politician

Ambica Banerjee (28 August 1928 – 25 April 2013) was a member of the 15th Lok Sabha. He was elected as a All India Trinamool Congress candidate from Howrah (Lok Sabha constituency).

Banerjee was born in 1928 to Shri Anilmohon Banerjee and Shyama Devi in Sibpur, West Bengal. He graduated B.E In Mechanical Engineering from Hatfield Technical College and became Mechanical Engineer.

In 2001, 1996, 1991, 1987 and 1982 state assembly elections, Ambica Banerjee won from the Howrah Central assembly seat. Banerjee died in Kolkata on 25 April 2013.
