= Anandaram Dhekial Phookan College =

College in Assam

- Type: Undergraduate college, Postgraduate college
- Established: 1959 (67 years ago)
- Affiliations: Gauhati University
- President: Shri Sahajananda Ojah
- Principal: Dr. Mridul Kumar Hazarika
- Location: RRB Road, Haibargaon, Nagaon, Assam, India; 26.344759°N 92.675949°E
- Website: adpcollege.ac.in

Anandaram Dhekial Phookan College is an undergraduate and postgraduate college established in the year 1959 at South Haibargaon of Nagaon district in Assam. The college is affiliated to Gauhati University.

== Departments ==
=== Arts ===
- Assamese
- Arabic
- Bengali
- Education
- English
- Economics
- History
- Political science
- Philosophy

=== Science ===
- Botany
- Chemistry
- Computer science
- Geography
- Herbal Science & Technology
- Mathematics
- Physics
- Statistics
- Zoology

=== Commerce ===
- Accountancy

== Courses ==
=== Undergraduate Courses ===
- Bachelor of Arts
- Bachelor of Science
- Bachelor of Commerce
- Bachelor of Computer Applications

=== Post Graduate Courses ===
- Master of Arts in Assamese
- Master of Arts in History
- Master of Science in Herbal Science

=== UGC Sponsored Courses ===
- Fashion Designing
- Diploma in Fashion & Dress Designing Technology (FDDT)
- Certificate Course in Fashion & Dress Designing
- Certificate Course in Electronic Instrument Maintenance
- Certificate Course in Human Rights and Duties
- Certificate Course on Gandhian Studies
- Certificate Course in Web Designing
- Certificate Course in Bio-informatics
- M.Sc. in Herbal Science and Technology

== Accreditation ==
- In 2016 the college has been awarded "A" grade with CGPA 3.11 by National Assessment and Accreditation Council. The college is also recognised by University Grants Commission (India).
- ADP College was given 'Star College' title by Ministry of Science and Technology (India) in the year 2020.
