= 1952 West Bengal Legislative Assembly election =

Assembly Election of West Bengal, India

- 31 March 1952

All 238 seats in the West Bengal state assembly 120 seats needed for a majority
- Turnout: 42.23%
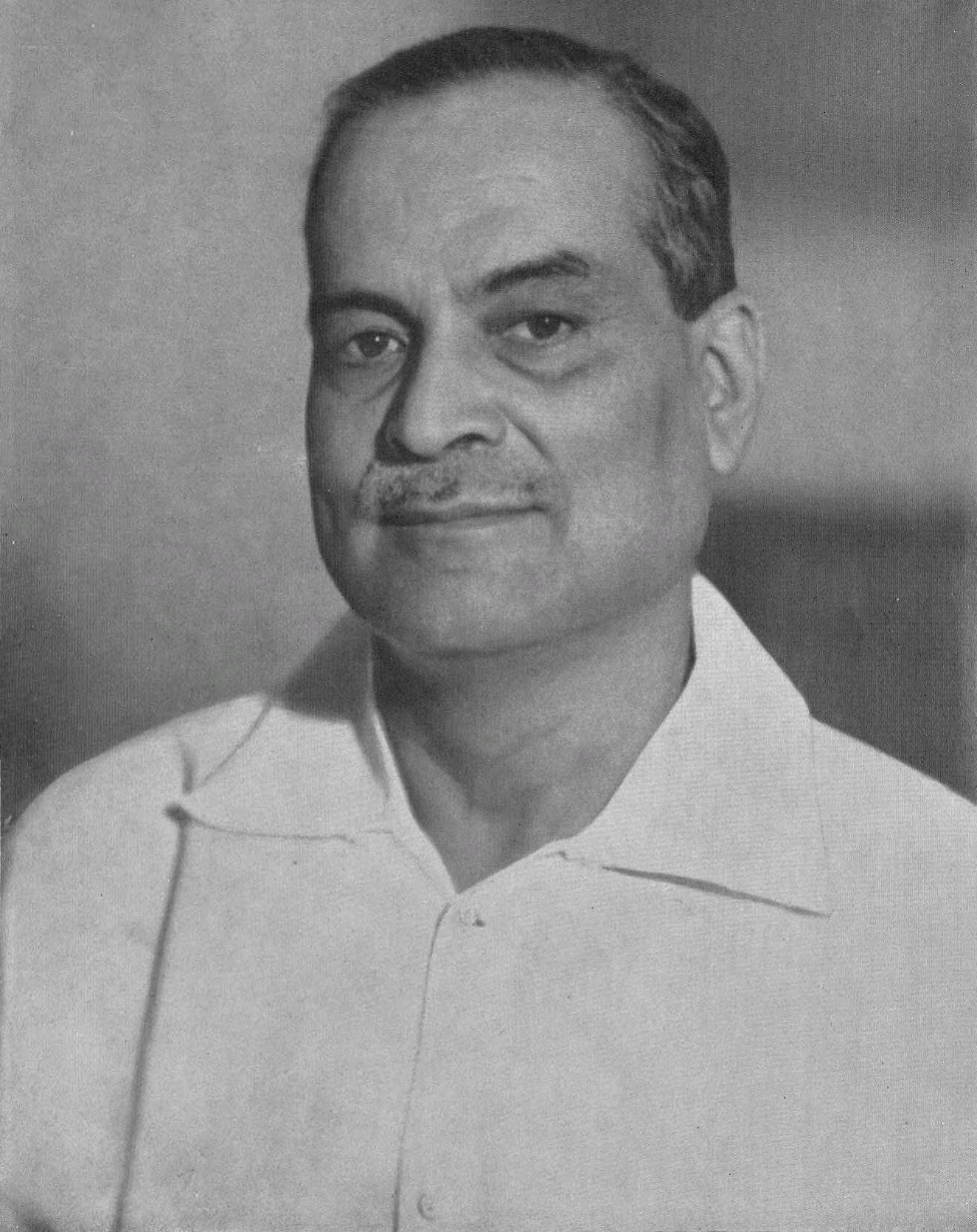

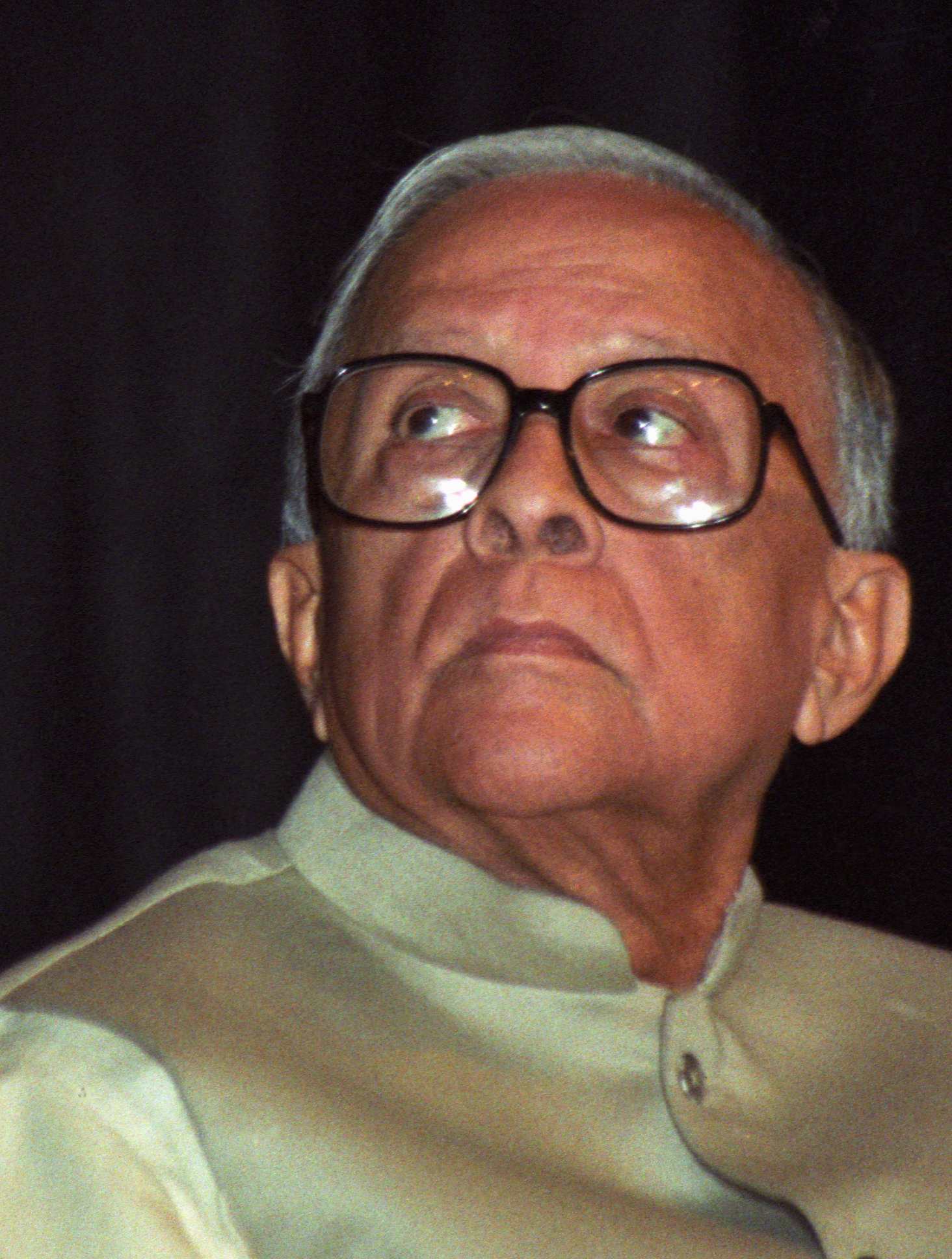
| | First party | Second party |
|---|---|---|
| Leader | Bidhan Chandra Roy | Jyoti Basu |
| Party | INC | CPI |
| Leader since | 1952 | 1952 |
| Leader's seat | Bowbazar | Baranagar |
| Last election | N/A | N/A |
| Seats won | 150 | 28 |
| Seat change | N/A | N/A |
| Popular vote | 2,889,994 | 800,951 |
| Percentage | 38.82% | 10.76% |
| Swing | N/A | N/A |
- Structure of the West Bengal Legislative Assembly after the election
Chief Minister before election
Bidhan Chandra Roy
INC
Elected Chief Minister
Bidhan Chandra Roy
INC

Indian administrative divisions, as of 1951

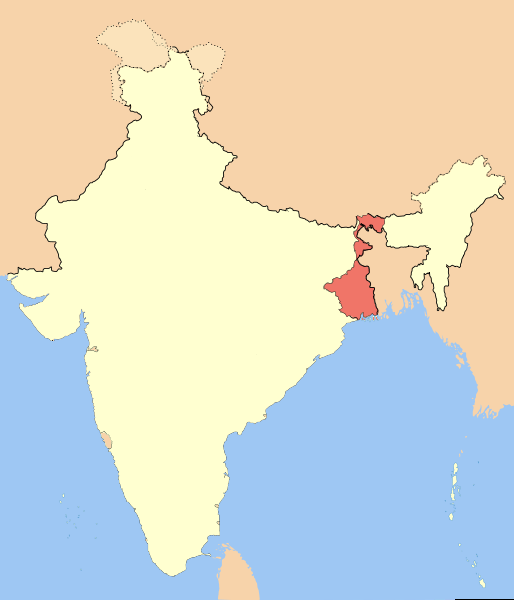
West Bengal, India

The West Bengal State Assembly Election of 1952 was a part of the series of Legislative Assembly elections in 1952. It was the first ever assembly election held in West Bengal.

== Alliances ==
On the political left, two alliances had emerged the United Socialist Organisation of India (an alliance between the Communist Party of India, the Socialist Republican Party and the Forward Bloc (Marxist Group)) and the People's United Socialist Front (comprising the Socialist Party, the Forward Bloc (Ruikar) and the Revolutionary Communist Party of India).

== Results ==
=== Alliance wise result ===
The election was won by the Indian National Congress, who got a majority of its own in the assembly. The communists became the largest opposition party.

| USOI | SEATS | PUSF | SEATS | INC+ | SEATS | OTHERS | SEATS | OTHERS | SEATS |
|---|---|---|---|---|---|---|---|---|---|
| CPI | 28 | SPI | 0 | INC | 150 | BJS | 9 | IND | 19 |
| SRP | 0 | FB(R) | 1 | | | ABHM | 4 | KMPP | 15 |
| AFBM | 11 | RSP | 0 | | | ABRRP | 0 | | |
| TOTAL (1952) | 39 | TOTAL (1952) | 2 | TOTAL (1952) | 150 | TOTAL (1952) | 13 | TOTAL (1952) | 34 |

=== Party wise result ===
Summary of results of the 1952 West Bengal Legislative Assembly election
| Political party | Flag | Seats Contested | Won | % of Seats | Votes | Vote % |
|---|---|---|---|---|---|---|
| Indian National Congress | | 236 | 150 | 63.56 | 2,889,994 | 38.82 |
| Kisan Mazdoor Praja Party | | 129 | 15 | 6.36 | 667,446 | 8.97 |
| Communist Party of India | | 86 | 28 | 11.86 | 800,951 | 10.76 |
| Bharatiya Jana Sangh | | 85 | 9 | 3.81 | 415,458 | 5.58 |
| Forward Bloc (Marxist Group) | | 48 | 11 | 4.66 | 393,591 | 5.29 |
| Socialist Party | | 63 | 0 | | 215,382 | 2.89 |
| Akhil Bharatiya Hindu Mahasabha | | 33 | 4 | 1.69 | 1,76,762 | 2.37 |
| Forward Bloc (Ruikar) | | 32 | 2 | 0.85 | 1,07,905 | 1.45 |
| Revolutionary Socialist Party | | 16 | 0 | | 63,173 | 0.85 |
| Revolutionary Communist Party of India (Tagore) | | 10 | 0 | | 32,859 | 0.44 |
| Bolshevik Party of India | | 8 | 0 | | 20117 | 0.27 |
| Akhil Bharatiya Ram Rajya Parishad | | 14 | 0 | | 7,100 | 0.10 |
| Independent | | 614 | 19 | 8.05 | 1,653,165 | 22.21 |
| Total seats | | 238 | Voters | 17,628,239 | Turnout | 7,443,903 (42.23%) |

== Elected members ==
| No | Constituency | Reserved for (SC/ST/None) | Member | Party |
|---|---|---|---|---|
| 1 | Kalimpong | None | Lalit Bahadur Kharga | Communist Party of India |
| 2 | Darjeeling | None | Dalbahadur Singh Gahatraj | Independent |
| 3 | Jore Bungalow | None | Shiva Kumar Rai | Independent |
| 4 | Kurseong Siliguri | None | Tenzing Wangdi | Indian National Congress |
| 4 | Kurseong Siliguri | None | George Mahbert | Independent |
| 5 | Jalpaiguri | None | Ashrumati Devi | Indian National Congress |
| 5 | Jalpaiguri | None | Khagendra Nath Dasgupta | Indian National Congress |
| 6 | Western Duars | None | Sasadhar Kar | Indian National Congress |
| 6 | Western Duars | None | Munda Antoni Topno | Indian National Congress |
| 7 | Mainaguri | None | Surendra Nath Roy | Indian National Congress |
| 8 | Dhupguri | None | Rabindra Nath Sikdar | Indian National Congress |
| 9 | Alipur Duars | None | Pijush Kanti Mukherjee | Indian National Congress |
| 9 | Alipur Duars | None | Dhirandra Bramha Mandal | Indian National Congress |
| 10 | Central Duars | None | Jajneswar Roy | Indian National Congress |
| 10 | Central Duars | None | Bhagat Mangaldas | Indian National Congress |
| 11 | Mekliganj | None | Satyendra Prasanna Chatterjee | Indian National Congress |
| 12 | Mathabhanga | None | Sarada Prasad Pramanick | Indian National Congress |
| 13 | Dinhate | None | Satish Chandra Roy Singha | Indian National Congress |
| 13 | Dinhate | None | Umesh Chandra Mandal | Indian National Congress |
| 14 | Cooch Behar | None | Maziruddin Ahmed | Indian National Congress |
| 14 | Cooch Behar | None | Jatindra Nath Singha Sarkar | Indian National Congress |
| 15 | Raiganj | None | Shyama Prasad Barman | Indian National Congress |
| 15 | Raiganj | None | Gulam Hamidur Rahman | Indian National Congress |
| 16 | Itahar | None | Banamali Das | Indian National Congress |
| 17 | Gangarampur | None | Satindra Nath Basu | Indian National Congress |
| 18 | Balurghat | None | Saroj Ranjan Chattopadhyaya | Indian National Congress |
| 18 | Balurghat | None | Lakshman Chandra Hasda | Indian National Congress |
| 19 | Gazole | None | Dharanidhar Sarkar | Communist Party of India |
| 20 | Kharba | None | Tafazzal Hossain | Indian National Congress |
| 21 | Harishchandrapur | None | Ramhari Roy | Indian National Congress |
| 22 | Ratua | None | Md. Sayeed Mia | Indian National Congress |
| 23 | Manikchak | None | Pashupati Jha | Indian National Congress |
| 24 | Malda | None | Nikunjabehari Gupta | Indian National Congress |
| 24 | Malda | None | Raipada Das | Independent |
| 25 | Kalichak (north) | None | Abul Barkat Ataul Gani | Independent |
| 26 | Kaliachak (south) | None | Sowrindra Mohan Misra | Indian National Congress |
| 27 | Nalhati | None | Yeakub Hossain | Indian National Congress |
| 28 | Murarai | None | Jogendra Narayan Das | Kisan Mazdoor Praja Party |
| 29 | Rampurhat | None | Panchanan Let | Forward Bloc |
| 29 | Rampurhat | None | Srikumar Bandopadhyaya | Forward Bloc |
| 30 | Nanur | None | Saha Sisir Kumar | Indian National Congress |
| 30 | Nanur | None | Murarka Basanta Lal | Indian National Congress |
| 31 | Bolpur | None | Roy Hanseswar | Indian National Congress |
| 31 | Bolpur | None | Hansadah Bhusan | Indian National Congress |
| 32 | Suri | None | Majhi Nishapati | Indian National Congress |
| 32 | Suri | None | Sen Gupta Gopika Bilas | Indian National Congress |
| 33 | Khayrasole | None | Bandopadhyaya Khagendra Nath | Indian National Congress |
| 34 | Farakka | None | Giasuddin | Indian National Congress |
| 35 | Suti | SC | Lutfal Haque | Independent |
| 36 | Sagardighi | None | Shyamapada Bhattacharyya | Indian National Congress |
| 36 | Sagardighi | None | Kuber Chand Haldar | Indian National Congress |
| 37 | Lalgola | None | Kazeemali Meerza | Indian National Congress |
| 38 | Murshidabad | None | Durgapada Sinha | Indian National Congress |
| 39 | Raninagar | None | Jainal Abedin Kezi | Indian National Congress |
| 40 | Jallangi | None | A . M . A . Zaman | Indian National Congress |
| 41 | Hariharpara | None | A . Hamid ( Haji ) | Indian National Congress |
| 42 | Newada | None | Mahammad Israil | Independent |
| 43 | Beldanga | None | Kshitish Chandra Ghose | Indian National Congress |
| 44 | Bharatpur | None | Bijoyendu Narayan Roy | Indian National Congress |
| 45 | Burwan Khargram | None | Satyendra Chandra Ghosh Maulik | Indian National Congress |
| 45 | Burwan Khargram | None | Sudhir Mondal | Indian National Congress |
| 46 | Kandi | None | Goalbadan Trivedi | Indian National Congress |
| 47 | Berhampore | None | Bejoy Kumar Ghosh | Indian National Congress |
| 48 | Chhatna | None | Probodh Chandra Dutta | Hindu Mahasabha |
| 48 | Chhatna | None | Kamala Kanta Hembram | Indian National Congress |
| 49 | Raipur | None | Jadu Nath Murmu | Independent |
| 49 | Raipur | None | Jatindra Nath Basu | Indian National Congress |
| 50 | Khatra | None | Ashutosh Mallik | Indian National Congress |
| 50 | Khatra | None | Amulya Ratan Ghose | Hindu Mahasabha |
| 51 | Taldangra | None | Purabi Mukherjee | Indian National Congress |
| 52 | Barjora | None | Prafulla Chandra Roy | Indian National Congress |
| 53 | Gangajalghati | None | Dhirendra Nath Chatterjee | Indian National Congress |
| 54 | Bankura | SC | Rakhahari Chatterjee | Hindu Mahasabha |
| 55 | Vishnupur | None | Kiran Chandra Digar | Indian National Congress |
| 55 | Vishnupur | None | Radha Gobinda Roy | Indian National Congress |
| 56 | Sonamukhi | None | Sishuram Mandal | Indian National Congress |
| 56 | Sonamukhi | None | Bhabataran Chakraborty | Indian National Congress |
| 57 | Binpur | None | Mongal Chandra Saren | Indian National Congress |
| 57 | Binpur | None | Nripendra Gopal Mitra | Bharatiya Jana Sangh |
| 58 | Gopiballavepore | None | Dhananjoy Kar | Kisan Mazdoor Praja Party |
| 58 | Gopiballavepore | None | Jagatpati Hansda | Kisan Mazdoor Praja Party |
| 59 | Jhargram | None | Madan Mohan Khan | Bharatiya Jana Sangh |
| 59 | Jhargram | None | Mohendra Nath Mahato | Indian National Congress |
| 60 | Narayangarh | None | Surendranath Pramanik | Kisan Mazdoor Praja Party |
| 60 | Narayangarh | None | Krishna Chandra Satpati | Bharatiya Jana Sangh |
| 61 | Pingla | None | Pulin Behari Maity | Bharatiya Jana Sangh |
| 62 | Danton | None | Jnanendra Kumar Choudhury | Bharatiya Jana Sangh |
| 63 | Kharagpur | None | Moulana Muhammad Momtaz | Indian National Congress |
| 64 | Garbetta | None | Saroj Roy | Communist Party of India |
| 65 | Salboni | None | Bejoy Gopal Goswami | Independent |
| 66 | Patashpur | None | Janardan Sahu | Bharatiya Jana Sangh |
| 67 | Keshpur | None | Nagendra Doloi | Communist Party of India |
| 67 | Keshpur | None | Gangapada Kuor | Kisan Mazdoor Praja Party |
| 68 | Ghatal | None | Amulyacharan Dal | Communist Party of India |
| 68 | Ghatal | None | Jatishchandra Ghosh | Communist Party of India |
| 69 | Daspur | None | Mrigendra Bhattachariya | Communist Party of India |
| 70 | Panskura North | None | Rajanikanta Pramanik | Indian National Congress |
| 71 | Panskura South | None | Shyama Bhattacharyya | Indian National Congress |
| 72 | Sabang | None | Gopal Chandra Das Adhikary | Indian National Congress |
| 73 | Moyna | None | Kanilal Bhowmic | Communist Party of India |
| 74 | Tamluk | None | Ajoy Kumar Mukherjee | Indian National Congress |
| 75 | Mahisadal | None | Kumar Deba Prosad Garga | Independent |
| 76 | Nandigram North | None | Subodh Chandra Maity | Indian National Congress |
| 77 | Nandigram South | None | Prabir Chandra Jana | Indian National Congress |
| 78 | Sutahata | None | Kumar Chandra Jana | Kisan Mazdoor Praja Party |
| 79 | Ramnagar | None | Trailakya Nath Pradhan | Indian National Congress |
| 80 | Contai North | None | Sudhir Chandra Das | Kisan Mazdoor Praja Party |
| 81 | Contai South | None | Natendra Nath Das | Kisan Mazdoor Praja Party |
| 82 | Mohanpur | None | Basanta Kumar Panigrahi | Bharatiya Jana Sangh |
| 83 | Khejri | None | Koustuv Kanti Karan | Indian National Congress |
| 83 | Khejri | None | Abha Maity | Indian National Congress |
| 84 | Bhagawanpur | None | Rameswar Panda | Bharatiya Jana Sangh |
| 85 | Shyampur | None | Sasabindu Bera | Forward Bloc |
| 86 | Uluberia | None | Bijoy Mondal | Forward Bloc |
| 86 | Uluberia | None | Bibhuti Bhusan Ghosh | Forward Bloc |
| 87 | Bagnan | None | Sambhu Charan Mukhopadhaya | Indian National Congress |
| 88 | Amta South | None | Arabinda Roy | Indian National Congress |
| 89 | Amta Central | None | Tarapada Pramanik | Indian National Congress |
| 90 | Amta North | None | Alamohon Dass | Independent |
| 91 | Sankrail | None | Kanai Lal Bhattacharya | Forward Bloc |
| 91 | Sankrail | None | Kripa Sindhu Shaw | Forward Bloc |
| 92 | Jagatballavpur | None | Amrita Lal Hazra | Indian National Congress |
| 93 | Howrah North | None | Biren Banerjee | Communist Party of India |
| 94 | Howrah East | None | Saila Kumr Mukhopadhyaya | Indian National Congress |
| 95 | Howrah West | None | Bankim Chandra Kar | Indian National Congress |
| 96 | Howrah South | None | Beni Charan Dutta | Indian National Congress |
| 97 | Domjur | None | Tarapada Dey | Communist Party of India |
| 98 | Bally | None | Ratan Moni Chattopadhyaya | Indian National Congress |
| 99 | Singoor | None | Sourendra Nath Saha | Communist Party of India |
| 99 | Singoor | None | Ajit Kumar Basu | Communist Party of India |
| | Uttarpara | None | Monoranjan Hazra | Communist Party of India |
| 101 | Serampore | None | Jitendra Nath Lahiri | Indian National Congress |
| 102 | Bhadreswar | None | Byomkerh Majumdar | Indian National Congress |
| 103 | Goghat | None | Radha Krishna Pal | Independent |
| 104 | Arambagh | None | Madan Mohan Saha | Communist Party of India |
| 104 | Arambagh | None | Radha Krishna Pal | Independent |
| 105 | Tarakeswar | None | Parbati Hazra | Indian National Congress |
| 106 | Chinsurah | None | Jyotish Chandra Ghosh | Forward Bloc |
| 106 | Chinsurah | None | Radha Nath Das | Indian National Congress |
| 107 | Dhanialkhali | None | Dhirendra Narayan Mukherji | Indian National Congress |
| 107 | Dhanialkhali | None | Loso Hasda | Indian National Congress |
| 108 | Balagarh | None | Brindaban Chattopadhyay | Indian National Congress |
| 109 | Burdwan | None | Binoy Krishna Chaudhury | Communist Party of India |
| 110 | Khandaghosh | None | Jonab Mahammad Hossain | Indian National Congress |
| 111 | Raina | None | Dasarathi Tah | Kisan Mazdoor Praja Party |
| 111 | Raina | None | Mritunjoy Pramanik | Kisan Mazdoor Praja Party |
| 112 | Galsi | None | Mahitosh Saha | Indian National Congress |
| 112 | Galsi | None | Jadabendra Nath Panja | Indian National Congress |
| 113 | Ausgram | None | Ananda Gopal Mukhepadhyay | Indian National Congress |
| 113 | Ausgram | None | Kanai Lal Das | Indian National Congress |
| 114 | Raniganj | None | Banku Behari Mandal | Indian National Congress |
| 114 | Raniganj | None | Pashupati Nath Maliah | Independent |
| 115 | Kulti | None | Baidyanath Mandal | Indian National Congress |
| 115 | Kulti | None | Joynarayan Sarma | Indian National Congress |
| 116 | Asansol | None | Atindra Nath Bose | Forward Bloc |
| 117 | Kalna | None | Baidyanath Santal | Indian National Congress |
| 117 | Kalna | None | Rash Behari Sen | Indian National Congress |
| 118 | Purbasthali | None | Bimalananda Tarkatirtha | Indian National Congress |
| 119 | Manteswar | None | Annada Prasad Mandal | Indian National Congress |
| 120 | Katwa | None | Subodh Chowdhury | Communist Party of India |
| 121 | Mangalkot | None | Bhakta Chandra Roy | Indian National Congress |
| 122 | Ketugram | None | Tarapada Bandyopadhyay | Hindu Mahasabha |
| 123 | Karimpur | None | Haripada Chatterjee | Kisan Mazdoor Praja Party |
| 124 | Tehatta | None | Raghunandan Biswas | Indian National Congress |
| 125 | Kaliganj | None | Jonab S. M. Fazlur Rahaman | Indian National Congress |
| 126 | Nakesipara | None | Jagannath Majumdar | Indian National Congress |
| 127 | Chapra | None | Smarajit Bandopadhya | Indian National Congress |
| 128 | Krishnagar | None | Bejoy Lal Chattapadhya | Indian National Congress |
| 129 | Nabadwp | None | Niranjan Modak | Indian National Congress |
| 130 | Santipur | None | Sashibhusan Khan | Indian National Congress |
| 131 | Ranaghat | None | Bijoy Krishna Sarkar | Indian National Congress |
| 131 | Ranaghat | None | Keshab Chandra Mitra | Indian National Congress |
| 132 | Bongaon | None | Jiban Ratan Dhar | Indian National Congress |
| 133 | Gaighata | None | Ziaul Hoque | Indian National Congress |
| 134 | Habra | None | Tarun Kanti Ghosh | Indian National Congress |
| 135 | Sarup Nagar | None | Mahammad Ishaque | Indian National Congress |
| 136 | Deganga | None | Rafiuddin Ahmed | Indian National Congress |
| 137 | Haroa Sandeshkhali | None | Jyotish Chandra Roy Sardar | Indian National Congress |
| 137 | Haroa Sandeshkhali | None | Hemanta Kumar Ghoshal | Communist Party of India |
| 138 | Hasnabad | None | Bijesh Chandra Sen | Indian National Congress |
| 138 | Hasnabad | None | Rajkrishna Mandol | Indian National Congress |
| 139 | Basirhat | SC | Prafulla Banerjee | Indian National Congress |
| 140 | Dum Dum | None | Kanai Lal Das | Indian National Congress |
| 141 | Bhangar | None | Hemchandra Naskar | Indian National Congress |
| 141 | Bhangar | None | Gangadhar Naskar | Communist Party of India |
| 142 | Baruipore | None | Lalit Kumar Sinha | Communist Party of India |
| 142 | Baruipore | None | Abdus Shokur | Indian National Congress |
| 143 | Joynagar | None | Subodh Banerjee | Independent |
| 143 | Joynagar | None | Dintaran Moni | Independent |
| 144 | Baraset | None | Amulya Dhan Mukhopadhyay | Indian National Congress |
| 145 | Bizpur | None | Bipin Behari Ganguli | Indian National Congress |
| 146 | Naihati | None | Suresh Chandra Paul | Indian National Congress |
| 147 | Barrackpur | None | Phanindranath Mukhopadhya | Indian National Congress |
| 148 | Bhatpara | None | Dayaram Beri | Indian National Congress |
| 149 | Titagarh | None | Krishna Kumar Sukla | Indian National Congress |
| 150 | Baranagar | SC | Jyoti Basu | Communist Party of India |
| 151 | Mathurapur | None | Bhusan Chandra Das | Kisan Mazdoor Praja Party |
| 151 | Mathurapur | None | Brindaban Gayan | Indian National Congress |
| 152 | Saugar | None | Haripaba Baguli | Kisan Mazdoor Praja Party |
| 153 | Kulpi | None | Nalini Kanta Halder | Kisan Mazdoor Praja Party |
| 153 | Kulpi | None | Prankrishna Kumar | Bharatiya Jana Sangh |
| 154 | Mograhat | None | Ardhendu Sekhar Naskar | Indian National Congress |
| 154 | Mograhat | None | Abul Hashem | Indian National Congress |
| 155 | Falta | None | Jyotish Chandra Roy | Communist Party of India |
| 156 | Diamond Harbour | SC | Charu Chandra Bhandari | Kisan Mazdoor Praja Party |
| 157 | Bishnupur | None | Basanta Kumar Mal | Indian National Congress |
| 157 | Bishnupur | None | Provash Chandra Roy | Communist Party of India |
| 158 | Budge Budge | None | Bankim Mukherjee | Communist Party of India |
| 159 | Mohestola | None | Sudhir Chandra Bhandari | Communist Party of India |
| 160 | Garden Reach | None | S . M . Abdullah | Indian National Congress |
| 161 | Tollyganj | None | Jyotish Joarder | Independent |
| 162 | Behala | None | Biren Roy | Forward Bloc |
| 163 | Cossipur | None | Biswanath Roy | Indian National Congress |
| 164 | Shampukur | None | Hemanta Kumar Bose | Independent |
| 165 | Kumartuli | None | Nepal Chandra Roy | Forward Bloc |
| 166 | Burtola | None | Nirmal Chandra De | Indian National Congress |
| 167 | Muchipara | None | Sankar Prasad Mitra | Indian National Congress |
| 168 | Jorabagan | None | Ram Lagan Singh | Indian National Congress |
| 169 | Jorasanko | None | Amarendra Nath Basu | Forward Bloc |
| 170 | Belgachia | None | Ganesh Ghose | Communist Party of India |
| 171 | Manicktala | None | Ranendra Nath Sen | Communist Party of India |
| 172 | Beliaghata | None | Suhrid Kumar Mullick Choudhury | Forward Bloc |
| 173 | Barabazar | None | Iswar Das Jalan | Indian National Congress |
| 174 | Colootola | None | Anandi Lal Poddar | Indian National Congress |
| 175 | Sealdah | None | Pannalal Bose | Indian National Congress |
| 176 | Vidyasagar | None | Narayan Chandra Roy | Independent |
| 177 | Taltola | None | Moulavi Shamsul Haque | Indian National Congress |
| 178 | Baniapukur Ballygunge | None | Pulin Behari Khatic | Indian National Congress |
| 178 | Baniapukur Ballygunge | None | Jogesh Chandra Gupta | Indian National Congress |
| 179 | Bhawanipur | None | Mira Dutta Gupta | Indian National Congress |
| 180 | Kalighat | None | Manikuntala Sen | Communist Party of India |
| 181 | Tollygunge (north) | None | Priya Ranjan Sen | Indian National Congress |
| 182 | Tollygunge (south) | None | Ambica Chakravorty | Communist Party of India |
| 183 | Watgunge | None | Kali Mukherjee | Indian National Congress |
| 184 | Alipur | ST | Satyendra Kumar Basu | Indian National Congress |
| 185 | Fort | None | Narendra Nath Sen | Indian National Congress |
| 186 | Bowbazar | None | Bidhan Chandra Roy | Indian National Congress |
| 187 | Entally | None | Debendra Chandra Dev | Indian National Congress |

== State Reorganization ==
On 1 November 1956, under States Reorganisation Act, 1956, a portion of the Purnea district east of the river Mahananda and the Purulia sub-district of the Manbhum district in the south (except Char Thana) were transferred from Bihar to West Bengal. Thus, assembly constituencies in West Bengal increased from 187 (238 seats) to 195 (252 seats) during 1957 assembly elections.

== See also ==
- 1951–52 elections in India
- 1957 West Bengal Legislative Assembly election
