= M. Mokshed Ali =

Indian politician

M. Mokshed Ali was an Indian politician, belonging to the Revolutionary Communist Party of India.

Ali won the Santipur seat in the West Bengal Legislative Assembly in the 1969 election. Ali and the other RCPI legislator Anandi Das were expelled from RCPI by party general secretary Sudhin Kumar in July 1969 for "anti-Party and anti-UF activities". In the 1971 West Bengal Legislative Assembly election Ali ran as an independent in Santipur, against the official RCPI candidate Bimalananda Mukherjee. He finished in third place with 3,744 votes (8.84%).
