= Bimalananda Mukherjee =

Indian politician

Bimalananda Mukherjee was an Indian politician, belonging to the Revolutionary Communist Party of India.

Mukherjee was arrested during the 1959 Food Movement struggle, along with other left leaders. As of 1960 he was the editor of Janasadharan.

Mukherjee won the Santipur seat in the West Bengal Legislative Assembly 1971, 1977, 1982 and 1987. Mukherjee was named as Minister of State for Excise in the second Left Front government formed after the 1982 West Bengal Legislative Assembly election.
