= Revolutionary Communist Party of India =

- Abbreviation: RCPI
- Secretary: Mihir Bain
- Founder: Saumyendranath Tagore
- Founded: 1 August 1934; 92 years ago
- Split from: Communist Party of India
- Headquarters: Kolkata
- Newspaper: Ganavani; Toilers' Front; Red Front
- Ideology: Communism; Anti-capitalism; Anti-Stalinism
- Colours: Red
- Alliance: Left Front

Party flag
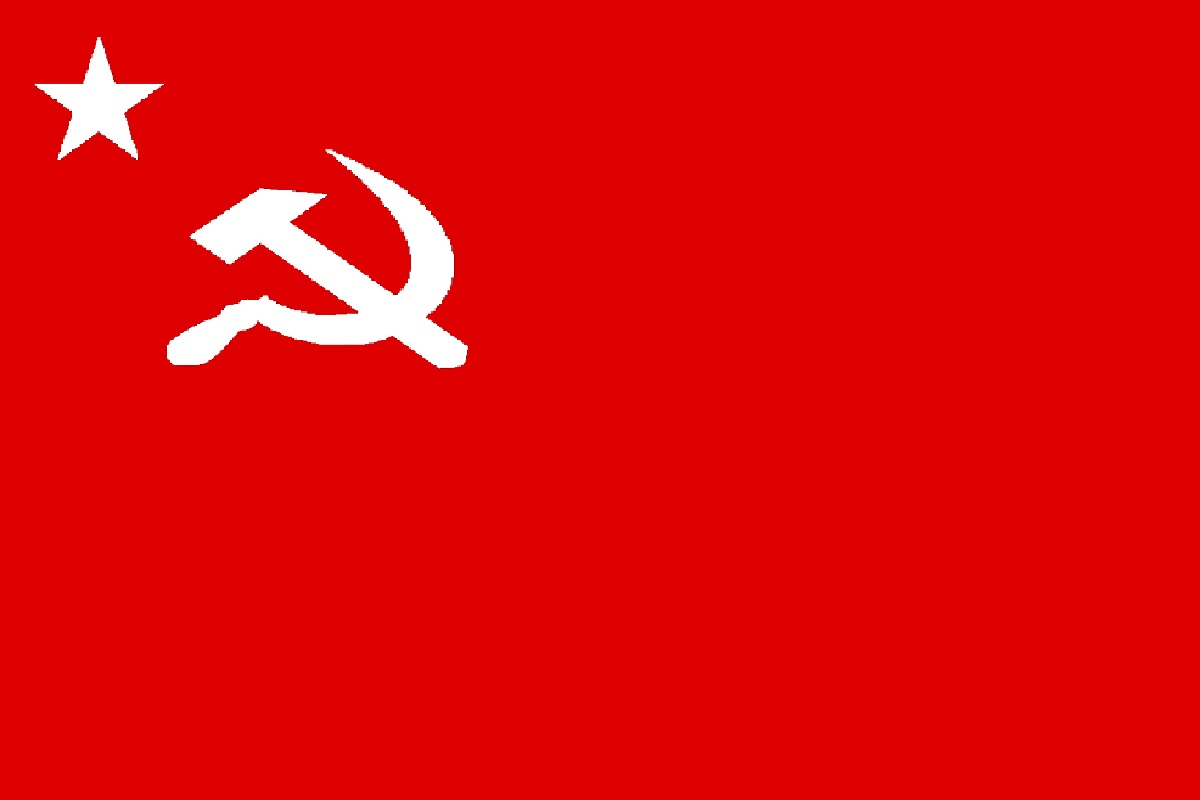

Website
- www.rcpi-communist.in

The Revolutionary Communist Party of India (abbreviated as RCPI) is a political party in India. The party was founded as the Communist League by Saumyendranath Tagore in 1934, breaking away from the Communist Party of India (CPI). RCPI led armed uprisings after the independence of India, but later shifted to parliamentary politics. The party is active in Assam, Kerala, West Bengal, Telangana and Andhra Pradesh. The party was represented in the West Bengal government while being a part of Second United Front Cabinet (1969) as well as in various state government during the Left Front rule in the state (1977–2011). In Assam, the party won four Legislative Assembly seats in 1978, but its political influence has since declined in the state.

== Ideology ==
The RCPI works toward a socialist revolution, rather than a people's democratic revolution, a national democratic revolution or a new democratic revolution.

The party strives to build socialism under the leadership of the proletariat with active cooperation of other exploited strata of the humanity, including peasants, working intellectuals and non-manual working sections of people.

== Communist League ==
S.N. Tagore founded the Communist League on 1 August 1934. Tagore was a communist leader from Bengal who had attended the 1928 Sixth Congress of the Communist International, and had stayed in Europe for seven years afterwards. He toured the continent on behalf of the League Against Imperialism. At the 1928 Communist International congress Tagore had sought to challenge the role of M.N. Roy in the organization. Tagore had turned hostile towards Stalin, possibly as in reaction to his failed bid to gain recognition from the Communist International in 1928. On his return to India in 1934 he appealed to CPI to abandon its ultra-left line. Albeit CPI would later moderate its positions after the Seventh Congress of the Communist International, Tagore broke with CPI and founded his own communist group (the Communist League). In May 1934 Tagore set up an 'initiative committee' for the founding of the new party. Other founders of the Communist League included Sudhir Dasgupta, Prabhat Sen, Ranjit Majumdar and Arun Banerjee.

Tagore denounced the Popular Front line of CPI, rejecting the Congress Socialist Party. In Tagore's view the CSP represented an alliance between socialists and reactionary elements of the bourgeoise.

== Communist League and the peasantry ==
After the formation of the Communist League Tagore began touring the Bengal country-side, organizing peasants to struggle for abolishing the zamindari system. In early 1938 Tagore built a peasants wing, the Bangiyo Pradeshik Kisan Sabha, separate from the CPI-led Krishak Samiti. Tagore's BPKS demanded abolition of the zamindari system without giving any compensation to landlords, free distribution of land among the cultivators and agricultural labourers, minimization of revenue demands and cancellation of debts to moneylenders.

== Communist League in Murshidabad ==
Tarapada Gupta set up the Communist League branch in Murshidabad in 1936, raising the red flag for the first time in recorded history in the district. Tarapada Gupta had been released from jail in 1935, and he established contact with Tagore's group. The Communist League preceded both the CPI and the RSP in Murshidabad. The party successfully organized peasants to refuse to pay rents to landlords in the area. Gupta would later side with Tagore in the 1948 party split.

== Tagore in Assam ==
RCPI was the first left organization to established itself in Assam. RCPI built a student movement in Assam. In 1937 a Radical Club was formed at Cotton College, under the cover of the and with Haren Kalita as its leader. In November 1938 Tagore visited Assam and met with a group of students and youth. His visit was organized by the Congressman Debranath Sarma. A Communist League branch was formed in the province in 1939, with several of the Cotton College students as its members. Students who became members of the Communist League included Haren Kalita, Haridas Deka, Tarunsen Deka, Upen Sarma, Ananda Chandra Das, Taracharan Majumdar, Gokul Medhi, Arabinda Ghosh, Loknath Barua, Umakanta Sarma, Bhupen Mahanta, N. Buragohain, Khagendranath Barbarua, Uma Sarma and Kamini Goswami. The students would later contest, and eventually win, the Cotton College Students Union through the Assam Provincial Students Federation.

Tagore made a second visit to Assam in December 1941. This time he visited Khagen Barbarua at his village in Upper Assam and discussed building the party organization in the province. Tagore was expelled from Assam on 18 December 1941. The Assam Provincial Student Federation, which was under the influence of RCPI supported the Quit India movement.

On 2 May 1940 the Krishak Banuva Panchayat was formed in Gauhati as the open front group of the party in Assam. Kedarnath Goswami was the first president of KBP, a former Congressman and labour organizer. The basic unit of KBP was the Gaon Krishak Panchayat ('Village Peasants Council'). The Assamese folk singer Bishnu Prasad Rabha joined KBP in 1945. In 1949 he became a RCPI member.

As the Indian National Congress dominated the tea gardens of Assam and there was little industrial labour in the province, the Communist League instead sought to organize rice mill workers, horse cart drivers and steamboat labourers. The efforts had meagre results. Notably RCPI made no intents to build the party in the hill areas of Assam.

== RCPI and the World War ==
The party was organized along Leninist lines with party cells at the bottom of the party hierarchy and the Central Committee as its leadership. In preparation of the impending World War, the party developed a three-tier leadership structure in order for the party to survive under waves of repression. The third tier was entirely clandestine, prepared to take over the party affairs after arrests of the first two tiers.

The party raised the slogan "Not one paisa, not one man for war". On 4 September 1939 Tagore issued a declaration, labelling the war as an imperialist conflict and called on the Indian workers to turn the imperialist war into civil war. Tagore was arrested and jailed under the Defence of India Act immediately afterwards. With Tagore in jail, Pannalal Dasgupta became general secretary of the party. He toured Assam, Bombay, Madras and Bengal. During the Second World War, peasants influenced by the party were instructed not to sell rice for exportation.

In 1941 the Third Party Conference of the Communist League of India changed its name to Communist Party of India (not to be confused with its far more well-known namesake). In March 1943 the name RCPI was adopted, in order to differentiate itself from the CPI. The party positioned itself claiming to be the sole true leftist party in the country, denouncing all other left forces as ideologically bankrupt. Overall RCPI avoided collaboration with other left-wing groups. RCPI labour organizing was done largely outside the All India Trade Union Congress. It managed to build a core of political cadres and was active building a labour movement amongst workers at the jute mills in the Beliaghata-Narkeldanga area of Calcutta. The party was often referred to as the 'Tagorites' or as the 'Ganavani group' (after the name of its publication).

RCPI differed with CPI on tactical questions during the Second World War. RCPI denounced the Molotov–Ribbentrop Pact as well as declaring the Soviet war with Finland as 'imperialist'.

The RCPI fully supported the Quit India movement. The party sought to develop the Quit India movement into a revolutionary upheaval. Most of the known party leaders were arrested, and would remain in detention until the end of the Second World War. Through the Radical Institute, RCPI promoted dissemination of locally produced weaponry to use against British government forces in Assam.

In the "Red Front", in October 1942, Saumyendranath Tagore wrote:

The conclusions that we draw from the Quit India movement are the following:

First, the utter bankruptcy of the Congress, the party of the Indian bourgeoisie and its total inability to lead the national movement.

Secondly, the complete overthrow of non-violence as a technique of struggle.

Thirdly, the complete exposure of the National Frontists, the legal Communists, the germ-carriers of anti-revolutionary Stalinism.

Fourthly, the rapid revolutionisation of the masses.

Fifthly, the ripening of the ideological premises for the growth of real leftism as a result of the political development, both national and international.

The national revolution in India has definitely jumped over the hurdles of Gandhism and has scornfully rejected the petty bourgeois Congress Socialism which is at the service of the Indian bourgeoisie.

It has thoroughly exposed the legal communist traitors of the Stalinist and the Royist brand. Only the political line of the Revolutionary Communist Party stands fully vindicated by the development and march of the national revolutionary movement.

In 1945 RCPI raised two key slogans in Assam, 'land to the tiller' (nangal jar mati tar) and 'one third share' (tin bhag), slogans which became very popular amongst landless peasants and agricultural labourers. KBP was able to make some inroads amongst these sectors.

Some Tribal League leaders in Assam, such as Aniram Basumatari and Daben Khaklari, became RCPI members in the mid-1940s. Their presence in the party helped it to make inroads amongst the tribals in Assam.

== Independence and Partition ==
As the departure of British colonial rule came closer, RCPI denounced the negotiated independence as a joint conspiracy between British imperialism and the Indian bourgeoisie. RCPI stated that Independence obtained in 1947 was a false one. Rejecting the official process for independence, RCPI began organizing panchayats (i.e. soviets) of workers and peasants in order to convene a Workers and Peasants Constituent Assembly. RCPI denounced the Partition of India as betrayal and surrender to British imperialism. There was a strong Hindu chauvinist trend within RCPI, as alleged by Charles W. Ervin. RCPI opposed the 1946 Cabinet Mission to India, which wanted to place Assam into the Muslim-majority grouping of provinces. According to Salkia, through its opposition to the Cabinet Mission grouping RCPI was able to carve out "a niche for itself in the mainstream politics of Assam".

In 1946 RCPI discussed a possible merger with the Bolshevik-Leninist Party of India, Ceylon and Burma. The RCPI delegation in the talks consisted of Sudhir Dasgupta, Tarapada Gupta, and Gour Pal. Nevertheless, the merger discussion didn't go through. RCPI refused to join the Fourth International. The BLPI discarded the RCPI line of organizing soviets as a premature move.

In September 1947 RCPI and BLPI collaborated to build a United Workers Front to challenge the Congress-led trade unions. In December 1947 Tagore was elected president of the All India Bank Employees Association, at its conference held in Lucknow.

== Tagore–Dasgupta split ==
Tagore was jailed in November 1947. Tagore was released from prison in 1948. After his release from jail Tagore argued that armed revolution was premature in India. But a sector of the party, led by Pannalal Dasgupta, insisted on turning the campaign of building panchayats into a general armed insurrection.

Dasgupta assembled an All India Party Conference in Birbhum in 1948. Tagore requested to resign from the RCPI Central Committee, a request the Birbhum conference rejected. After the Birbhum conference the followers of Dasgupta began to gather arms and prepare for armed struggle. The developments inside RCPI had an echo in the CPI. Dasgupta's view that India was ripe for armed revolution coincided with the position of the new CPI leader B.T. Ranadive.

After the Birbhum conference Tagore, at a public meeting in Calcutta, denounced insurrectional line of Dasgupta. Tagore's speech pushed the Dasgupta group to issue disciplinary action against him, accepting his resignation from the Central Committee. Half a year later Tagore gathered his followers for a separate Party Conference, as its 5th Party Congress, in Burdwan. Thus there were two parallel RCPIs, one led by Dasgupta and one led by Tagore. Dasgupta represented the majority group in the split. It was sometimes known as 'RCPI (Rebel Group)' or as 'RCPI (Dasgupta)'. The Tagore-led party was known as 'RCPI (Tagore)'.

== 26 February 1949 attacks ==
On 26 February 1949 the Dasgupta-led RCPI initiated its armed revolt. They attacked the Dum Dum Airfield, Jessop & Company and the Dum Dum Gun and Shell Factory. At the Jessop plant equipment was stolen. Several persons were killed or injured in the attacks. At the Dum Dum Gun and Shell Factory the sentry was shot. The British manager at Jessop was thrown into a furnace, as were two other Europeans. Another European was stabbed, and later died. At Dum Dum Airfield a plane was set on fire and seven rifles stolen. The militants then moved towards Basirhat. On Jessore Road they attacked the Gouripour Police Post. At Basirhat they attacked a police station, killing two guards and stealing 26 rifles. The militants attempted to flee into East Pakistan. Eventually the group was caught as police reinforcements arrived from Calcutta. A police inspector was killed during the gun fight. Only two of the attackers managed to escape arrest. 39 RCPI cadres were arrested, including Dasgupta himself. They were held without trial for 4–5 years, and then sentenced to jail. Dasgupta himself was sentenced to imprisonment for life.

After the 1949 revolt, the party cast away its line of insurrectional politics. Whilst RCPI acted from underground, no formal ban was placed on the party.

== Assam insurgency ==
The Assam branch of RCPI sided with Dasgupta in the 1948 split. In the wake of Independence, RCPI and CPI initiated mass peasant unrest in Assam. In the wake of the Dum Dum-Basirhat attacks, the party decided to launch an armed movement for the independence of Assam from India. The party held a conference in Khowang, Dibrugarh, at which is decided to build a 'People's Army' as an armed mass front of the party. RCPI-led uprisings in Assam took place between 1948 and 1952. Khagen Barbarua led the movement in the non-tribal areas in Upper Assam. The party raised the battle cry 'land belongs to the one who wields a plough, the jungle belongs to one who wields an axe', calling for ownership rights for sharecroppers. The Assam government placed a ban on the party, citing the pretext that RCPI organized peasants to cease payments to landlords and supported illegal felling of trees.

In early 1950 RCPI killed Ganga Sarma, a local Indian National Congress leader in Assam, during a meeting. According to the government of Assam, RCPI committed 12 assassinations in the state in 1950. RCPI financed its rebellion in Assam through robberies and extortion. The government responded by cracking down on RCPI in Assam. The government responded by cracking down on RCPI in Assam. As a symbolic protest against the state violence, RCPI cadres tore down the national flag at different places in the state. In the wake of state repression against RCPI, the party lost influence amongst the sharecroppers in Assam.

In the wake of state repression against RCPI, the party lost influence amongst the sharecroppers in Assam. In Assam RCPI and CPI were at loggerheads, especially around the issue of the Soviet Union (RCPI accusing CPI of being controlled by the Soviets, CPI accusing RCPI of being anti-Soviet). RCPI-CPI relations reached its lowest point in 1952.

== Work amongst refugees ==
RCPI had a mass organization, the Bastuhara Kalyan Parishad, which organized relief activities in camps of refugees from East Pakistan. The party also had a separate refugee women's organization, Bangiya Dal Seba Sangathan. RCPI concentrated its work amongst refugees in Nadia district. In 1948–1949 the RCPI and the All India Forward Bloc dominated the Chandmari and Goshala refugee camps in Nadia district. Prabhat Mukherjee and Amalendu Neogi were key RCPI leaders at Chandmari camp. At Goshala the RCPI cadre Arun Banerjee organized refugee youth into revolutionary politics. The party joined the United Central Refugee Council (UCRC) in August 1950. RCPI (Rebel) in UCRC and ULF. In October 1950 RCPI forcefully took control of 175 bighas near Gayeshpur Colony and redistributed the land amongst 350 refugee families.

== First General Election ==
The party boycotted the 1951–1952 elections. In October 1952, the Assam government withdrew the ban on the RCPI.

== Union activism ==
RCPI was active within the United Trade Union Congress, but opposed RSP domination of UTUC.

== RCPI in Bihar ==
RCPI never gained any prominence in Bihar. The influence of the party solely included a few trade unions in Chhotanagpur. One union influenced by RCPI was the Hindustan Khan Mazdoor Sangh, a coal miners' union.

== RCPI in Bombay ==
Krishna Desai, a textile worker from Bombay, joined RCPI in 1947. He was elected to the Bombay Municipal Corporation at numerous times as a RCPI candidate. Desai joined CPI ahead of the 1967 state assembly election.

Desai had sought refugee in Calcutta, as he was on the run after his role in communal violence. The stayed with the RCPI there and when he returned to Bombay he founded a RCPI branch there. Another labour organizer of RCPI in Bombay was K.L. Bajaj, who became a RCPI member after a visit to Calcutta in the early 1950s. He joined CPI(M) in 1964 and later became vice president of the Centre of Indian Trade Unions.

RCPI took part in the Samyukta Maharashtra struggle of the 1950s.

== 1957 elections ==
The party fielded 5 candidates in the 1957 West Bengal Legislative Assembly election.

Khagen Barbarua of RCPI was elected to the Assam Legislative Assembly in the 1957 Assam Legislative Assembly election from the Amguri constituency.

== 1960 Party Congress ==
The party held an All India Party Conference in Howrah in 1960. At the Howrah conference the Trotskyist Revolutionary Workers Party merged into the RCPI. Moreover, Howrah conference elected Sudhindranath Kumar as new general secretary of the party. Kumar had joined the party in 1936. As per an agreement between RWP and RCPI, the Trotskyists were given five seats in the RCPI Central Committee.

== 1962 elections ==
Ahead of the 1962 West Bengal Legislative Assembly election RCPI joined the CPI-led United Left Front. Two RCPI candidates were elected; Anadi Das from Howrah West and Kanai Pal (ex-RWP) from Santipur.

In Assam RCPI stayed out of the United Opposition Front set up by the Praja Socialist Party and independents. Khagen Barbarua retained the Amguri seat in the 1962 Assam Legislative Assembly election. RCPI had fielded 16 candidates in the election.

== 1962 Indo-China war ==
When Dasgupta returned after his release from jail, the relations with the former RWP cadres deteriorated. Dasgupta had evolved into a Nehru supporter. In the Indo-China war of 1962 RCPI supported the Nehru government, a move the Trotskyists opposed. As a result of the dispute over the Indo-China war, the Trotskyists broke with RCPI in 1963. Dasgupta himself parted ways with RCPI, moving towards a Gandhian position.

== 1967 elections ==
Kumar served as convenor of the United Front formed ahead of the 1967 West Bengal Legislative Assembly election. Anadi Das lost his assembly seat in the election. During the protests against the dismissal of the first United Front cabinet in 1967, Kumar was arrested under the Preventive Detention Act.

RCPI won 3 seats in the first Howrah Municipal Corporation polls, held in 1967.

Md. Shamsul Huda of RCPI won the Dhing seat in the 1967 Assam Legislative Assembly election.

== In the Second United Front government ==
After the 1969 West Bengal Legislative Assembly election Kumar was named Food and Supplies Minister in the second United Front state government. The Food Minister had been given to the Communist Party of India (Marxist) in the coalition government, but CPI(M) opted to name Kumar as its choice for the post.

The RCPI won two seats in the 1969 West Bengal Legislative Assembly election. Kumar was named convenor of the United Front as well as being named Food Minister in the Second United Front Cabinet. After Kumar's entry into the West Bengal state cabinet, the two RCPI legislators, Anadi Das and M. Mokshed Ali, revolted against Kumar's leadership. In July 1969 the two legislators were expelled from RCPI, accused of "anti-Party and anti-UF activities". The expulsion provoked a split in RCPI, with Anadi Das leading his own RCPI faction.

== 1970s ==
After the fall of the United Front cabinet, the RCPI joined the CPI(M)-led United Left Front. The front, which was formally constituted in May 1970, had Kumar as its convenor. In the 1971 West Bengal Legislative Assembly election RCPI won three seats; Bimalananda Mukherjee in Santipur, Sudhindranath Kumar in Howrah Central and Trilochan Mal in Hansan.

In the 1971 Indian general election RCPI and CPI(M) had an electoral understanding in Assam. RCPI fielded three candidates in the 1971 Lok Sabha election; two in Assam and one in Bihar. In the Nowgong constituency Baneswar Saikia obtained 32,619 votes (14.34%). In the Jorhat constituency Khogen Bar Barua finished in second place with 31,810 votes (17.10%), challenging Tarun Gogoi. In Bihar, Lakshmi Narayan Singh contested the Katihar seat and obtained 1,193 votes (0.43%).

In the 1972 West Bengal Legislative Assembly election RCPI fielded its three incumbent legislators; Mukherjee, Kumar and Mal. All three were defeated, gathering 47038 votes (0.35% of the statewide vote). Whilst RCPI lost its Dhing seat in the 1972 Assam Legislative Assembly election, it managed to score an impressive victory against Dharanidar Chowdhury in Bhabanipur constituency. The Bhabanipur legislator was Ghanakanta Boro.

As of the mid-1970s RCPI published the Bengali weekly Mat-o-Path and the Bengali fortnightly Janasadharan, both issued from Calcutta.

RCPI fielded a single candidate in the 1974 Orissa Legislative Assembly election. Sarangdhar Muduli, a trade unionist, contested the Sukinda seat and obtained 478 votes (1.21%)

== 1977 elections ==
Ahead of the 1977 Indian general election RCPI was one of the six founding parties of the CPI(M)-led West Bengal Left Front. The Left Front contested the general election in West Bengal with an electoral understanding with the Janata Party.

But whilst CPI(M) was supportive of the Janata Party in Assam in the 1977 Lok Sabha election, RCPI considered the Janata Party and the Congress(I) equally dangerous. RCPI fielded a single candidate; Shamsul Huda in the Kaliabor constituency. He finished in third place with 45,047 votes (15.63%).

In the subsequent 1977 West Bengal Legislative Assembly election RCPI fielded 4 candidates. Three of the candidates won their seats; Bimalananda Mukherjee was elected from Santipur, Trilochan Mal from Hansan and Sudhindranath Kumar from Howrah Central. Malati Bhusan Hazra finished in third place in Pingla. In total the party obtained 75,156 votes (0.52% of the statewide vote).

== Left Front era ==
After the 1977 election, Kumar was named Minister for Food and Civil Supplies in the first Left Front cabinet.

RCPI fielded three candidates in the 1982 West Bengal Legislative Assembly election; Mukherjee in Santipur, Kumar in Howrah Central and Mal in Hansan. In total the three candidates obtained 106,973 votes (0.48% of the statewide vote). Mukherjee and Mal retained their seats. Kumar lost the Howrah Central seat to Congress(I) candidate Ambica Banerjee. Kumar finished in second place with 29,785 votes (43.34%). After having lost his assembly seat, Kumar lost his post as minister. Bimalananda Mukherjee replaced him as the RCPI representative in the Left Front government. However, whilst Kumar had been a cabinet minister Mukherjee was named Minister of State (for Excise). In 1984 CPI(M) wanted to nominate Kumar for a Rajya Sabha (Upper House of the Parliament of India) seat, but that proposal met resistance from other Left Front partners. Kumar died in 1984.

In 1985 a by-election was held in the Hansan (SC) constituency, after the death of incumbent legislator Trilochan Mal. RCPI candidate Umakanta Roy won the by-election.

RCPI contested 8 out of 1111 seats in the West Bengal municipal elections of 1986.

RCPI fielded three candidates in the 1987 West Bengal Legislative Assembly election; Sankar Mondol in Howrah Central, Bimalananda Mukherjee in Santipur and Trilochan Das in Hansan. In total the RCPI candidates obtained 118,985 votes (0.42% of the statewide vote). Mukherjee was the sole RCPI candidate elected.

RCPI contested two seats in the 1991 West Bengal Legislative Assembly election; Trilochan Das in Hansan and Asim Ghosh in Santipur. Das won the Hansan seat.

In the 1996 West Bengal Legislative Assembly election RCPI fielded Bimalananda Mukherjee in Santipur and Mihir Bain in Hansan. Both finished in second place in their respective constituencies. The two RCPI candidates obtained 105,366 votes (0.29% of the statewide vote). RCPI failed to regain its presence in the assembly in the 2001 West Bengal Legislative Assembly election.

In the West Bengal panchayat elections, 2003 RCPI won 3 Gram Panchayat seats (0.01% of the seats in the state), 0 Panchayat Samiti seats and 1 Zilla Parishad seat (0.14% of the seats in the state). In Nadia district Asit Biswas was elected from Gayeshpur-II and Gita Rani Kundu won the Babla-VIII seat.

RCPI did not win any seat in the 2006 West Bengal Legislative Assembly election.

In the West Bengal panchayat elections, 2008 RCPI won 3 Gram Panchayat seats (0.01% of the seats in the state), 0 Panchayat Samiti seats and 1 Zilla Parishad seat (0.13% of the seats in the state).

RCPI contested ward 87 in the Kolkata Municipal Corporation election, 2010 with Simki Sengupta as its candidate. Sengupta, an artist, finished in third place with 684 votes (12.38% of the votes cast)

In the 2011 West Bengal Legislative Assembly election RCPI fielded Yar Mullick in Santipur and Kamal Hassan in Hansan. Both candidates were new contestants. The election symbol of the party was determined only a few weeks before the vote. Both candidates finished in second place in their respective constituencies. In total they obtained 107,662 votes (0.23% of the statewide vote).

== 1978 Assam elections ==
The left forces made significant headway in the post-Emergency 1978 Assam Legislative Assembly election. RCPI won 4 seats. In total 10 candidates ran on RCPI tickets, obtaining 72,445 votes.

The four RCPI legislators were Md. Shamsul Huda from Dhing, Baneswar Saikia from Batadroba, Khagen Barbarua from Amguri and Budha Baruah from Mahmara. Whilst Md. Shamsul Huda was elected with over 75% of the votes cast in his constituency, Baruah managed to get elected with just 20.9% of the votes cast. All other RCPI candidates forfeited their deposits. In the assembly RCPI formed a Left Bloc aligned with CPI(M), CPI, SUCI and CPI(ML).

RCPI and CPI(M) supported the formation of a Janata Party cabinet with Golap Borbora as Chief Minister.

When the Assam agitation began, RCPI and other progressive forces urged the agigatators to accept 25 March 1971 as the cut-off date for deportation of migrants. As Assam was engulfed in communal violence, members of RCPI and other left parties were killed or maimed. The popular support for RCPI and other left parties declined sharply as they had opposed the Assam agitation.

== RCPI in Assam after the Assam agitation ==
As of 1981 RCPI was part of the Left Democratic Alliance (along with CPI(M), CPI and SUCI). In April 1984 RCPI joined a convention of opposition parties (along with CPI, Congress (S) and the Janata Party), a move which side-lined the CPI(M). The April 1984 opposition convention used a language largely supportive of the Assam agitation.

RCPI fielded a single candidate in the 1996 Indian general election; Baneswar Saikia in the Nowgong constituency. He obtained 1,803 votes (0.25%). As of 1996 Baneswar Saikia served as the RCPI general secretary.

RCPI fielded two candidates in the 1998 Indian general election; Abdur Rashid in the Kaliabor constituency and Padma Kamal Phukon in the Jorhat constituency. In Kaliabor RCPI obtained 2,778 votes (0.43%) and in Jorhat the party obtained 1,642 votes (0.49%).

RCPI fielded a single candidate in the 1999 Indian general election; Baneswar Saikia in the Kaliabor constituency. He obtained 1,516 votes (0.20%).

RCPI joined the Nationalist Congress Party-led Regional Democratic Alliance ahead of the 2001 Assam Legislative Assembly election.

RCPI fielded a single candidate in the 2004 Indian general election; Raj Kumar Dowara in the Jorhat constituency. He finished in fifth place with 16,691.

RCPI fielded a single candidate in the 2009 Indian general election; Ambu Bora (then aged 78) in the Gauhati constituency. Bora received 7,788 votes (0.7% of the votes in the constituency).

== Later period ==
In the Kolkata Municipal Corporation, 2015 RCPI again contested ward 87 with Tarun Basu as its candidate.

== Leadership ==
In the Revolutionary Communist Party of India, Hiren Borgohain is the Assam State Secretary, Subhas Roy is the West Bengal State Secretary, and Mihir Bain is the Party Secretary and Secretary of the Central Committee.

== 2016 elections ==
As per the second list of Left Front candidates for the 2016 West Bengal Legislative Assembly election, released in March 2016, RCPI fielded Sanjay Basu, a Calcutta High Court lawyer, in the Santipur seat and Kamal Hassan in the Hansan seat. After a period of vacillation RCPI endorsed the Left Front-Congress electoral understanding ahead of the 2016 West Bengal Legislative Assembly election, although the agreement would mean no seats for RCPI to contest. Hassan's candidature was unofficially withdrawn in favour of the Indian National Congress after the prescribed date for withdrawal of nominations. Kamal Hassan obtained 751 votes (0.4%). Basu's nomination had been withdrawn prior to the prescribed date.

RCPI joined the six-party United Left ahead of the 2016 Assam Legislative Assembly election. RCPI contested the Dhing and Mahmara seats RCPI candidate Jamanur Rahman in Dhing obtained 737 votes (0.43%) and Nityananda Gogoi in Mahmara obtained 448 votes (0.43%). The party has since joined the 11-party Left-Democratic Manch, Assam. As of 2016 LDMA demanded that 24 March 1971, be chosen as the base year for deportation of foreigners from Assam.

== 2021 Assembly Elections ==
In 2021, the RCPI in West Bengal supported the Left Front's alliance with the Indian National Congress and the Indian Secular Front. However, the party in Assam clearly appealed to the people to vote against bourgeois parties and vote for left-wing candidates. Inamul Huda was the candidate of the RCPI and contested in the Dhing Legislative Assembly constituency. He gained 3,453 votes.

== 2026 Assembly Elections ==
In the General Assembly Elections of 2026, the RCPI in Assam contested in the Dhing Legislative Assembly Constituency. The party again called for strengthening the left-wing forces and voting against bourgeois forces. Zakir Islam was the candidate from the Dhing Legislative Assembly constituency who gained 3,088 votes.

In West Bengal, Sanjay Basu's name was declared by the Left Front as an RCPI candidate contesting from the Chowrangee seat. However, after the filing of nomination, it was revealed that had filed his nomination on a CPI(M) ticket. Basu ended up gaining 2,572 votes.

== Unity with Radical Socialist ==
In August 2026, the Revolutionary Communist Party of India (RCPI) entered into a process of political unity with Radical Socialist (RS), a political group recognised as the Indian section of the Fourth International. The process sought to bring together the traditions of RCPI and the Indian section of the Fourth International on the basis of their formative revolutionary Marxist and anti-Stalinist principles. The resulting organisation retained the name RCPI, citing the continuity of the RCPI since 1934. It reaffirmed a revolutionary socialist programme centred on working-class self-emancipation, democratic proletarian rule, opposition to Stalinism, class collaboration and ultra-left adventurism, and a transitional approach to socialist revolution.

== Mass Organisations ==
- Students' Wings:
  - Assam Provincial Students' Federation (APSF) (till 1949)
  - Progressive Students' Federation of India (PSFI)
- Youth Wing: Progressive Youth Federation of India (PYFI)
- Peasants' Wing: Krishak Panchayat
- Women's Wing: Xodou Axom Pragati Nari Sangha (সদৌ অসম প্ৰগতি নাৰী সংঘ)

== Leaders ==
- Anadi Das
- Saumyendranath Tagore
- Haren Kalita
- Bishnu Prasad Rabha
- Khagen Barbarua
- Baneswar Saikia
- Biren Deka
- Mihir Bain
- Sudhindranath Kumar
- Sabitri Chetia
- Mohanlal Mukherjee
- Bimalananda Mukherjee
- Achin Vanaik
