= 2026 Howrah Municipal Corporation election =

Upcoming Indian election in West Bengal

- TBA

All 68 wards for Howrah Municipal Corporation 35 seats needed for a majority
- Turnout: TBD

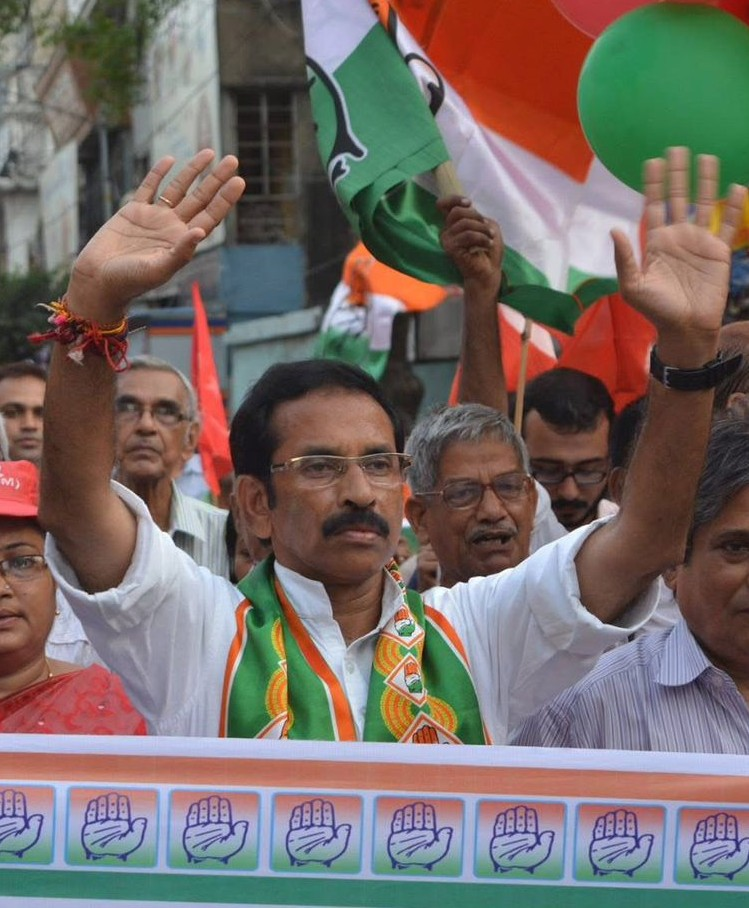

	First party	Second party
Leader	Suvendu Adhikari	Mohammed Salim
Party	BJP	CPI(M)
Alliance	NDA	Left Front
Last election	2 seats	2 seats
Seats before	2
	Third party	Fourth party
Leader	Subhankar Sarkar	Mamata Banerjee
Party	INC	MAITC
Alliance	INDIA	TMC+
Last election	2 seats	Party split
Seats before	2	New
Mayor before election
Vacant
Elected mayor
TBD

The 2026 Howrah Municipal Corporation election will be held on 2026 tentatively to elect 68 members of the Howrah Municipal Corporation (HMC) which governs the city of Howrah.

== Schedule ==
Poll event	Schedule
Notification date	
Last Date for filing nomination	
Last Date for withdrawal of nomination	
Date of poll	
Date of counting of votes	

== Parties and alliances ==
=== Bharatiya Janata Party ===
Bharatiya Janata Party
Party	Flag	Symbol	Leader	Seats contested
Bharatiya Janata Party			Samik Bhattacharya	68

=== Left Front ===
Left Front
Party	Flag	Symbol	Leader	Seats contested
Communist Party of India (Marxist)			Mohammed Salim	TBD
Communist Party of India			Swapan Banerjee	TBD
All India Forward Bloc			Gobinda Roy	TBD
Revolutionary Socialist Party			Tapan Hore	TBD
Communist Party of India (Marxist–Leninist) Liberation			Abhijit Majumder	TBD
Revolutionary Communist Party of India			Subhash Roy	TBD
Marxist Forward Bloc			Ashish Chakraborty	TBD

=== Others ===
Party	Flag	Symbol	Leader	Seats contested
Mamata All India Trinamool Congress			Mamata Banerjee	TBD
Democratic Trinamool Congress			Ritabrata Banerjee	TBD
Indian National Congress			Subhankar Sarkar	TBD
Socialist Unity Centre of India (Communist)			Provash Ghosh	TBD
Aam Aadmi Party			Sanjoy Basu	TBD
Bahujan Samaj Party			Achintya Kumar Biswas	TBD
All India Majlis-e-Ittehadul Muslimeen		kite	Imran Solanki	TBD

== Candidates ==
List of candidates
No.	Assembly	Ward								
No.	Assembly	Ward	BJP		INC		Left Front		MAITC	
No.	Assembly	Ward	Party	Candidate	Party	Candidate	Party	Candidate	Party	Candidate
1	Howrah Uttar	Ward 1	BJP		INC		LF		MAITC	
2	Howrah Uttar	Ward 2	BJP		INC		LF		MAITC	
3	Howrah Uttar	Ward 3	BJP		INC		LF		MAITC	
4	Howrah Uttar	Ward 4	BJP		INC		LF		MAITC	
5	Howrah Uttar	Ward 5	BJP		INC		LF		MAITC	
6	Howrah Uttar	Ward 6	BJP		INC		LF		MAITC	
7	Howrah Uttar	Ward 7	BJP		INC		LF		MAITC	
8	Howrah Uttar	Ward 8	BJP		INC		LF		MAITC	
9	Shibpur	Ward 9	BJP		INC		LF		MAITC	
10	Shibpur	Ward 10	BJP		INC		LF		MAITC	
11	Shibpur	Ward 11	BJP		INC		LF		MAITC	
12	Shibpur	Ward 12	BJP		INC		LF		MAITC	
13	Shibpur	Ward 13	BJP		INC		LF		MAITC	
14	Shibpur	Ward 14	BJP		INC		LF		MAITC	
15	Shibpur	Ward 15	BJP		INC		LF		MAITC	
16	Howrah Uttar	Ward 16	BJP		INC		LF		MAITC	
17	Howrah Uttar	Ward 17	BJP		INC		LF		MAITC	
18	Howrah Uttar	Ward 18	BJP		INC		LF		MAITC	
19	Howrah Uttar	Ward 19	BJP		INC		LF		MAITC	
20	Howrah Uttar	Ward 20	BJP		INC		LF		MAITC	
21	Howrah Uttar	Ward 21	BJP		INC		LF		MAITC	
22	Howrah Uttar	Ward 22	BJP		INC		LF		MAITC	
23	Howrah Uttar	Ward 23	BJP		INC		LF		MAITC	
24	Howrah Uttar	Ward 24	BJP		INC		LF		MAITC	
25	Howrah Madhya	Ward 25	BJP		INC		LF		MAITC	
26	Howrah Madhya	Ward 26	BJP		INC		LF		MAITC	
27	Howrah Madhya	Ward 27	BJP		INC		LF		MAITC	
28	Howrah Madhya	Ward 28	BJP		INC		LF		MAITC	
29	Shibpur	Ward 29	BJP		INC		LF		MAITC	
30	Shibpur	Ward 30	BJP		INC		LF		MAITC	
31	Shibpur	Ward 31	BJP		INC		LF		MAITC	
32	Shibpur	Ward 32	BJP		INC		LF		MAITC	
33	Shibpur	Ward 33	BJP		INC		LF		MAITC	
34	Shibpur	Ward 34	BJP		INC		LF		MAITC	
35	Howrah Dakshin	Ward 35	BJP		INC		LF		MAITC	
36	Howrah Dakshin	Ward 36	BJP		INC		LF		MAITC	
37	Howrah Dakshin	Ward 37	BJP		INC		LF		MAITC	
38	Howrah Dakshin	Ward 38	BJP		INC		LF		MAITC	
39	Howrah Dakshin	Ward 39	BJP		INC		LF		MAITC	
40	Howrah Dakshin	Ward 40	BJP		INC		LF		MAITC	
41	Howrah Dakshin	Ward 41	BJP		INC		LF		MAITC	
42	Howrah Dakshin	Ward 42	BJP		INC		LF		MAITC	
43	Shibpur	Ward 43	BJP		INC		LF		MAITC	
44	Howrah Madhya	Ward 44	BJP		INC		LF		MAITC	
45	Howrah Madhya	Ward 45	BJP		INC		LF		MAITC	
46	Howrah Madhya	Ward 46	BJP		INC		LF		MAITC	
47	Howrah Madhya	Ward 47	BJP		INC		LF		MAITC	
48	Howrah Madhya	Ward 48	BJP		INC		LF		MAITC	
49	Howrah Madhya	Ward 49	BJP		INC		LF		MAITC	
50	Howrah Madhya	Ward 50	BJP		INC		LF		MAITC	
51	Howrah Madhya	Ward 51	BJP		INC		LF		MAITC	
52	Howrah Madhya	Ward 52	BJP		INC		LF		MAITC	
53	Howrah Madhya	Ward 53	BJP		INC		LF		MAITC	
54	Howrah Madhya	Ward 54	BJP		INC		LF		MAITC	
55	Howrah Madhya	Ward 55	BJP		INC		LF		MAITC	
56	Howrah Madhya	Ward 56	BJP		INC		LF		MAITC	
57	Howrah Madhya	Ward 57	BJP		INC		LF		MAITC	
58	Howrah Madhya	Ward 58	BJP		INC		LF		MAITC	
59	Howrah Madhya	Ward 59	BJP		INC		LF		MAITC	
60	Howrah Madhya	Ward 60	BJP		INC		LF		MAITC	
61	Howrah Madhya	Ward 61	BJP		INC		LF		MAITC	
62	Howrah Madhya	Ward 62	BJP		INC		LF		MAITC	
63	Howrah Dakshin	Ward 63	BJP		INC		LF		MAITC	
64	Howrah Dakshin	Ward 64	BJP		INC		LF		MAITC	
65	Howrah Dakshin	Ward 65	BJP		INC		LF		MAITC	
66	Howrah Dakshin	Ward 66	BJP		INC		LF		MAITC	
67	Howrah Dakshin	Ward 67	BJP		INC		LF		MAITC	
68	Howrah Dakshin	Ward 68	BJP		INC		LF		MAITC	

== Turnout ==
No. of Voters	No. of Voters who cast votes	Voters Turnout (%)

== Result ==
=== Results by Parties ===
0	0	0	0	0	0
BJP	CPI(M)	MAITC	INC	CPI	IND

Vote share by alliance
1. NDA (0.00%)
2. LF+ (0.00%)
3. MAITC (0.00%)
4. INC (0.00%)
5. NOTA (0.00%)
6. IND (0.00%)
7. Others (0.00%)
Vote share by Party
1. BJP (0.00%)
2. CPI(M) (0.00%)
3. MAITC (0.00%)
4. INC (0.00%)
5. CPI (0.00%)
6. RSP (0.00%)
7. AIFB (0.00%)
8. CPI(ML)L (0.00%)
9. RCPI (0.00%)
10. MFB (0.00%)
11. SUCI(C) (0.00%)
12. BSP (0.00%)
13. AIMIM (0.00%)
14. Others (0.00%)
15. IND (0.00%)
16. NOTA (0.00%)

Alliance / Party		Popular vote			Seats		
Alliance / Party		Votes	%	±pp	Contested	Won	+/-
BJP							
Total							
LF+	CPI(M)						
LF+	CPI						
LF+	RSP						
LF+	AIFB						
LF+	CPI(ML)L						
LF+	RCPI						
LF+	MFB						
Total							
MAITC							
DTC							
INC							
SUCI(C)							
BSP							
IND							
NOTA							
Total				—			—

=== Results by wards ===
Results
		Winner			Runner Up			Margin
Assembly	Ward	Party	Candidate	Votes	Party	Candidate	Votes	Margin
Howrah Uttar	Ward 1							
Howrah Uttar	Ward 2							
Howrah Uttar	Ward 3							
Howrah Uttar	Ward 4							
Howrah Uttar	Ward 5							
Howrah Uttar	Ward 6							
Howrah Uttar	Ward 7							
Howrah Uttar	Ward 8							
Shibpur	Ward 9							
Shibpur	Ward 10							
Shibpur	Ward 11							
Shibpur	Ward 12							
Shibpur	Ward 13							
Shibpur	Ward 14							
Shibpur	Ward 15							
Howrah Uttar	Ward 16							
Howrah Uttar	Ward 17							
Howrah Uttar	Ward 18							
Howrah Uttar	Ward 19							
Howrah Uttar	Ward 20							
Howrah Uttar	Ward 21							
Howrah Uttar	Ward 22							
Howrah Uttar	Ward 23							
Howrah Uttar	Ward 24							
Howrah Madhya	Ward 25							
Howrah Madhya	Ward 26							
Howrah Madhya	Ward 27							
Howrah Madhya	Ward 28							
Shibpur	Ward 29							
Shibpur	Ward 30							
Shibpur	Ward 31							
Shibpur	Ward 32							
Shibpur	Ward 33							
Shibpur	Ward 34							
Howrah Dakshin	Ward 35							
Howrah Dakshin	Ward 36							
Howrah Dakshin	Ward 37							
Howrah Dakshin	Ward 38							
Howrah Dakshin	Ward 39							
Howrah Dakshin	Ward 40							
Howrah Dakshin	Ward 41							
Howrah Dakshin	Ward 42							
Shibpur	Ward 43							
Howrah Madhya	Ward 44							
Howrah Madhya	Ward 45							
Howrah Madhya	Ward 46							
Howrah Madhya	Ward 47							
Howrah Madhya	Ward 48							
Howrah Madhya	Ward 49							
Howrah Madhya	Ward 50							
Howrah Madhya	Ward 51							
Howrah Madhya	Ward 52							
Howrah Madhya	Ward 53							
Howrah Madhya	Ward 54							
Howrah Madhya	Ward 55							
Howrah Madhya	Ward 56							
Howrah Madhya	Ward 57							
Howrah Madhya	Ward 58							
Howrah Madhya	Ward 59							
Howrah Madhya	Ward 60							
Howrah Madhya	Ward 61							
Howrah Madhya	Ward 62							
Howrah Dakshin	Ward 63							
Howrah Dakshin	Ward 64							
Howrah Dakshin	Ward 65							
Howrah Dakshin	Ward 66							
Howrah Dakshin	Ward 67							
Howrah Dakshin	Ward 68							

== See also ==
- Howrah Municipal Corporation
- 2026 Trinamool Congress split
- 2026 West Bengal Legislative Assembly election
- 2023 West Bengal Panchayat elections
- 2024 Indian general election in West Bengal
- 2026 elections in India
