= Manoj Tiwary (cricketer) =

Indian cricketer and Politician

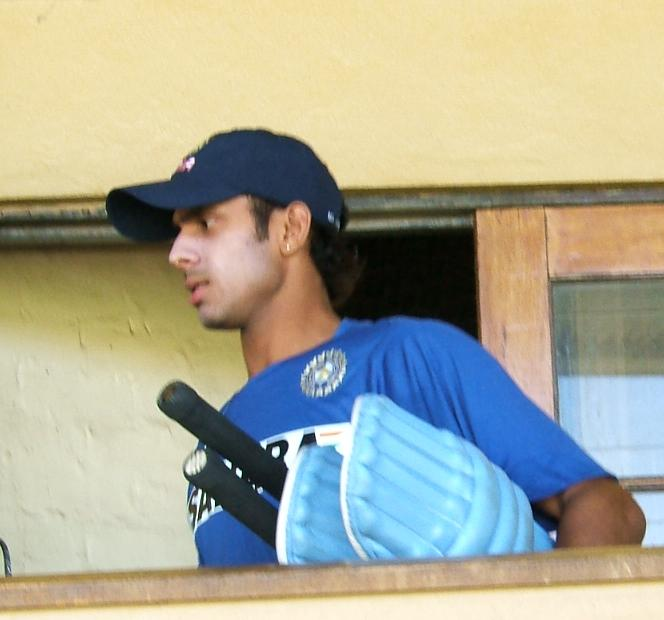

Minister of State, Government of West Bengal
- In office 10 May 2021 – 07 May 2026
- Governor: Jagdeep Dhankhar; La. Ganesan; C. V. Ananda Bose
- Chief Minister: Mamata Banerjee
- Ministry and Departments: Youth Affairs; Sports
- Preceded by: Lakshmi Ratan Shukla

Member of the West Bengal Legislative Assembly
- In office 02 May 2021 – 04 May 2026
- Preceded by: Jatu Lahiri
- Succeeded by: Rudranil Ghosh
- Constituency: Shibpur, Howrah

Personal details
- Born: 14 November 1985 (age 40) Howrah, West Bengal, India
- Party: All India Trinamool Congress (2021-2026)

Manoj Tiwary
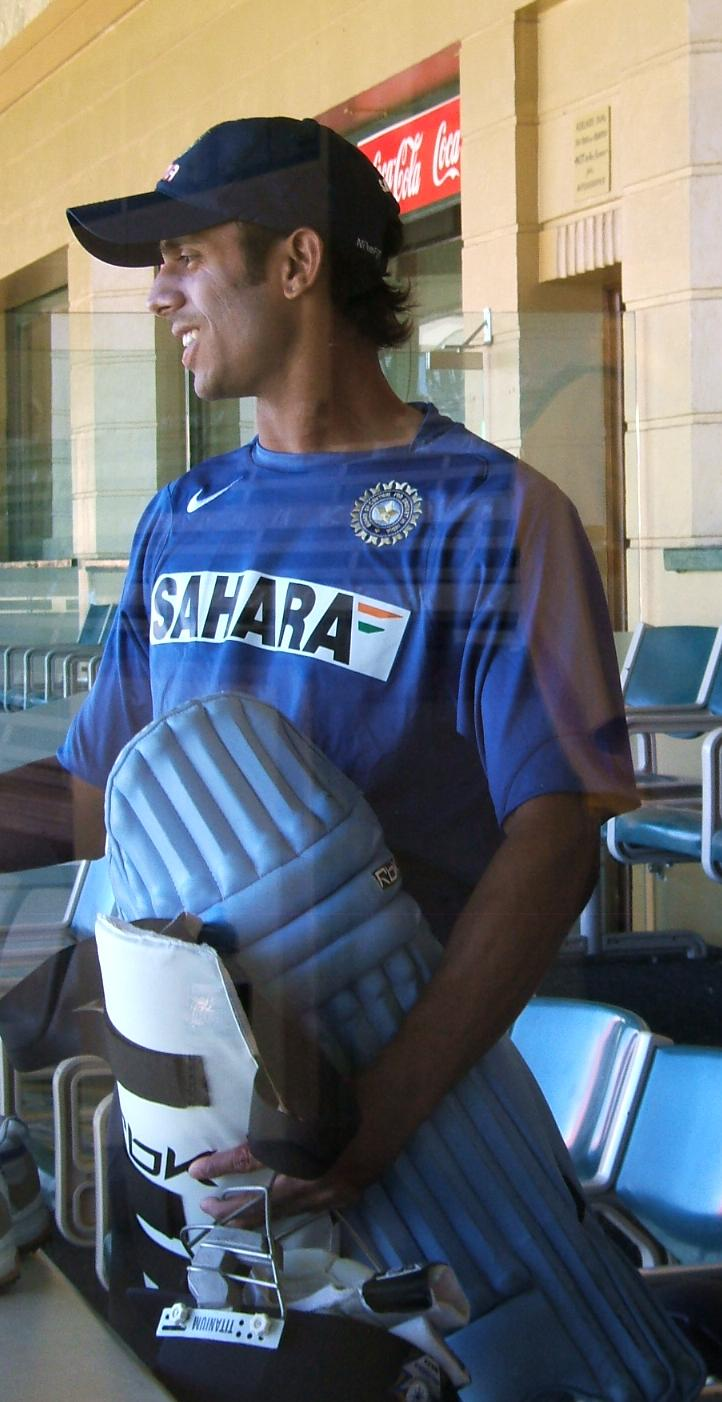

Personal information
- Height: 5 ft 8 in (1.73 m)
- Batting: Right-handed
- Bowling: Right-arm leg break
- Role: Batsman

International information
- National side: India (2008–2015)
- ODI debut (cap 171): 3 February 2008 v Australia
- Last ODI: 10 July 2015 v Zimbabwe
- ODI shirt no.: 9
- T20I debut (cap 40): 29 October 2011 v England
- Last T20I: 11 September 2012 v New Zealand
- T20I shirt no.: 9

Domestic team information
- Years: Team
- 2004/05–2023/24: Bengal
- 2008–2009: Delhi Daredevils (squad no. 9)
- 2010–2013: Kolkata Knight Riders (squad no. 9)
- 2014–2015: Delhi Daredevils (squad no. 9)
- 2016: Abahani Limited
- 2017: Rising Pune Supergiants (squad no. 45)
- 2018: Kings XI Punjab (squad no. 45)

Career statistics
Competition	ODI	T20I	FC	LA
Matches	12	3	119	163
Runs scored	287	15	8,752	5,466
Batting average	26.09	15.00	51.78	42.37
100s/50s	1/1	0/0	27/35	6/40
Top score	104*	15	303*	151
Balls bowled	132	–	3,303	2,354
Wickets	5	–	31	60
Bowling average	30.00	–	64.41	38.58
5 wickets in innings	0	–	0	1
10 wickets in match	0	–	0	0
Best bowling	4/61	–	2/19	5/34
Catches/stumpings	4/–	2/–	123/–	87/–
- Source: ESPNcricinfo, 18 January 2020

Manoj Kumar Tiwary (born 14 November 1985) is an Indian former international cricketer who is now a politician. He was a right-handed batter who bowled occasional leg break. Tiwary represented Bengal in domestic cricket and appeared for multiple Indian Premier League (IPL) franchisees like Delhi Daredevils, Kolkata Knight Riders, Kings XI Punjab and Rising Pune Supergiants across multiple editions of the IPL. He played One Day Internationals and Twenty20 Internationals for the Indian national cricket team. In 2021, he joined All India Trinamool Congress political party and was elected to the West Bengal Legislative Assembly later in the year.

Tiwary reversed his all-format retirement decision on 8 August 2023, less than a week after his initial announcement on 3 August 2023. He stated that he wanted one final attempt at winning the Ranji Trophy title for Bengal in the 2023/24 season.

== International career ==
Tiwary plays as an aggressive right-handed batsman. He made his international debut against Australia in the 2007–08 Commonwealth Bank Series in which he scored only 2 runs in his only innings. He was later included in the India team for the West Indies tour of 2011, as a replacement for Yuvraj Singh, who opted out of the series due to a lung infection. Tiwary played the 4th and 5th ODI in the series. He was later picked for England's tour of India in October. He played in the 5th ODI and scored 24 runs. He also played the only T20 and scored 15 runs. Tiwary was subsequently named in the squad for the ODIs against West Indies in November–December. He played in the 5th ODI at Chennai when India was down by two wickets for only one run in the first over of the match. Tiwary then went on build a solid innings which got him his scoring maiden ODI century (104 not out) despite having cramps and retired soon after getting his century. Eventually India won the match by 34 runs and he was awarded the Man-Of-The-Match for this match-winning knock. Even after the unbeaten century, Tiwary was made to sit in the reserves for 14 successive matches following the century. However, he made an auspicious comeback as an all-rounder replacing leg spinner Rahul Sharma against Sri Lanka at Colombo as he took 4/61 from his 10 overs with his leg-breaks to restrict the hosts to 251/8. He took the wickets of Dinesh Chandimal, Angelo Mathews, Jeevan Mendis and Thisara Perera, and followed it with a fighting 21 from 38 at a tough time coming at 60/3. India eventually won the match as Virat Kohli scored an unbeaten ton.

Tiwary also was picked for the Commonwealth Bank tri-series against Australia and Sri Lanka, but he didn't play any matches. Manoj Tiwary was again selected in the Indian team for the Asia Cup 2012 where again he didn't play any matches. Tiwary was also selected for the lone T20 against South Africa which was played celebrating 150 years of settlement of Indians in South Africa.

== Domestic career ==
In October 2017, Tiwary played in his 100th first-class cricket match, in the fixture between Bengal and Chhattisgarh in the 2017–18 Ranji Trophy.

Tiwary was the leading run-scorer for Bengal in the 2018–19 Vijay Hazare Trophy, with 366 runs in nine matches. In October 2018, he was named in India B's squad for the 2018–19 Deodhar Trophy. In November 2018, batting for Bengal against Madhya Pradesh in the 2018–19 Ranji Trophy, Tiwary scored his fifth double-century in first-class cricket. In January 2020, in the 2019–20 Ranji Trophy, he scored his maiden triple century in first-class cricket, with an unbeaten 303 runs.

== Indian Premier League ==
Tiwary was signed by Delhi Daredevils in the initial seasons of the Indian Premier League. He was traded to the Kolkata Knight Riders in exchange for Moises Henriques before the 2010 IPL season. In the auction for 4th edition of the Indian Premier League, he was signed by the Kolkata Knight Riders. He scored the winning runs for Kolkata in the final of 2012 competition.

In February 2017, Tiwary was bought by the Rising Pune Supergiants team for the 2017 Indian Premier League and in January 2018, he was bought by the Kings XI Punjab in the 2018 IPL auction.

== Political career ==
Tiwary joined Mamata Banerjee's All India Trinamool Congress party in February 2021. He was selected as a candidate for the 2021 West Bengal Legislative Assembly election in Shibpur (Vidhan Sabha constituency), winning the seat and is a Member of the Legislative Assembly of West Bengal. In the Third Banerjee ministry he was appointed a Minister of State for Affairs of Sports and Youth.

Tiwari quit the All India Trinamool Congress party on 5 May 2026, a day after the party lost the 2026 West Bengal Legislative Assembly election. After quitting, he made allegations of corruption in the TMC, saying he was refused a party ticket for the election because he refused to pay Rs 5 crores, while making many other allegations.
