= Umesh Rai =

Indian politician (born 1978)

Member of the West Bengal Legislative Assembly
- Incumbent
- Assumed office 4 May 2026
- Preceded by: Gautam Chowdhuri
- Constituency: Howrah Uttar

Minister of State for Parliamentary Affairs West Bengal
- Incumbent
- Assumed office 1 June 2026
- Preceded by: Sandharani Tudu

Minister of State for Urban Development and Municipal Affairs West Bengal
- Incumbent
- Assumed office 1 June 2026
- Preceded by: Chandrima Bhattacharya

Personal details
- Party: Bharatiya Janata Party
- Profession: Politician

Umesh Rai (born 1978) is an Indian politician from West Bengal. He is a member of the West Bengal Legislative Assembly from the Howrah Uttar Assembly constituency in Howrah district representing the Bharatiya Janata Party.

== Early life and education ==
Rai is from Howrah, Howrah district, West Bengal. He is the son of the late Beni Madhab Rai. He completed his Bachelor of Commerce at a college affiliated with Calcutta University in the year 1997. He runs his own business. He declared assets worth Rs.76 lakhs in his affidavit to the Election Commission of India.

== Career ==
Rai won the Howrah Uttar Assembly constituency representing the Bharatiya Janata Party in the 2026 West Bengal Legislative Assembly election. He polled 67,539 votes and defeated his nearest rival and sitting MLA, Gautam Chowdhuri of the All India Trinamool Congress by a margin of 11,250 votes. Earlier in the 2021 West Bengal Legislative Assembly election, he contested the Howrah Uttar seat on the BJP ticket and polled 66,053 votes, but lost to Gautam Chowdhuri of the Trinamool Congress, by a margin of 5,522 votes.

== See also ==
- 2026 West Bengal Legislative Assembly election
- List of chief ministers of West Bengal
- West Bengal Legislative Assembly
- 18th West Bengal Assembly
