= Nandita Chowdhury =

Indian politician

Member of the West Bengal Legislative Assembly
- Incumbent
- Assumed office May 2021
- Preceded by: Brajamohan Mazumder
- Constituency: Howrah Dakshin

Personal details
- Party: Mamata All India Trinamool Congress

Nandita Chowdhury is an Indian politician. She was elected to the West Bengal Legislative Assembly from Howrah Dakshin as a member of the Mamata All India Trinamool Congress.
