= Howrah Municipal Corporation =

Local civic body in Howrah, West Bengal, India

- Seal of the Howrah Municipal Corporation

Type
- Type: Municipal Corporation

History
- Founded: 1980; 46 years ago

Leadership
- Mayor: Vacant
- Deputy Mayor: Vacant
- Chairperson: Sujoy Chakraborty
- Seats: 68

Elections
- Last election: 2013
- Next election: 2026

Meeting place
- HMC Office, Howrah, West Bengal

Website
- www.myhmc.in

Howrah Municipal Corporation (HMC) is the local government of the city of Howrah, West Bengal, India. It is the second largest municipal corporation and urban area in the state. Howrah Municipal Corporation is under Kolkata Metropolitan Development Authority, KMDA and it falls in greater Kolkata. This civic administrative body administers an area of 63.55 square kilometres (24.54 sq mi) now.

== History ==
=== Foundation ===
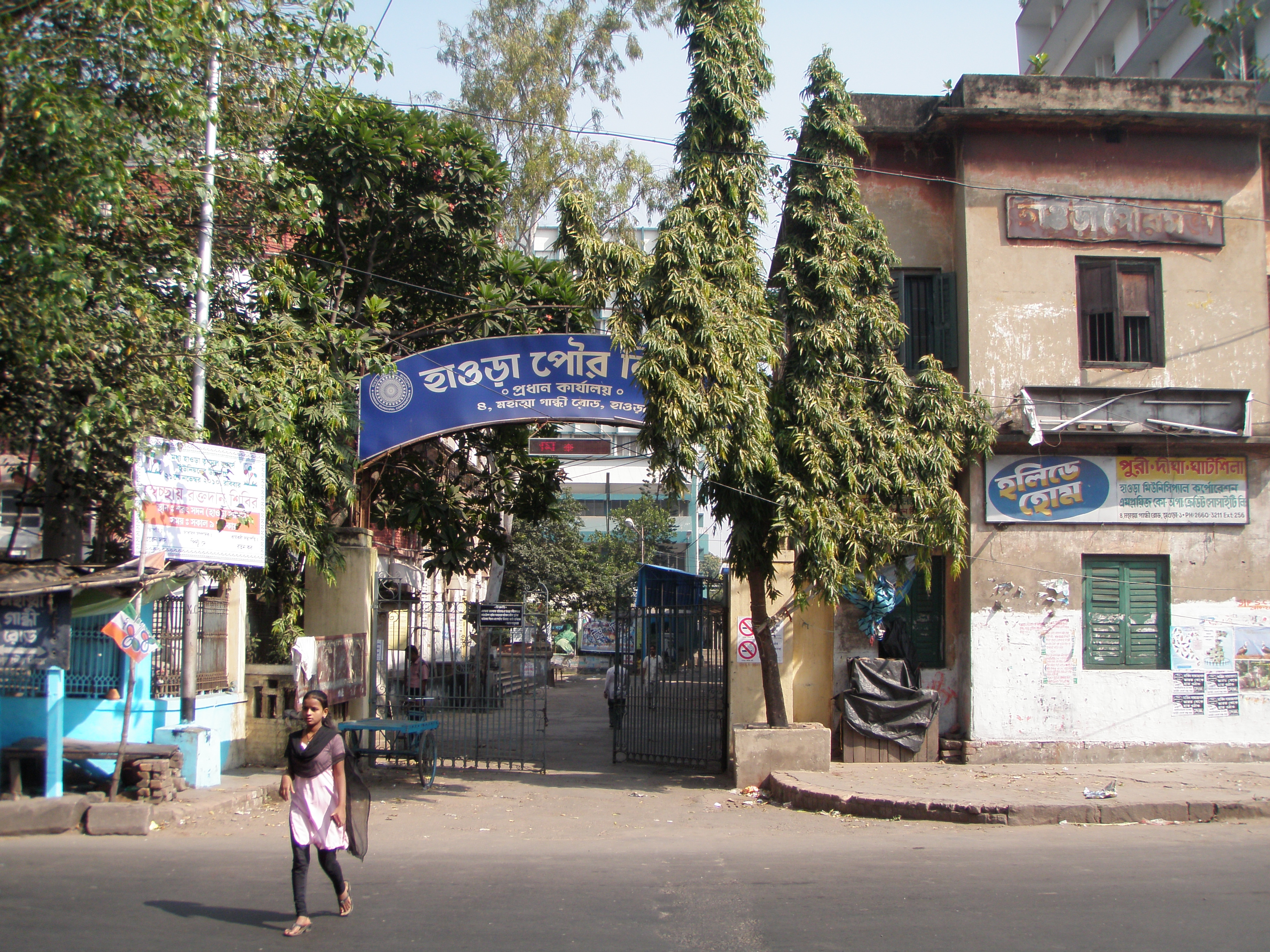
HMC old gate

The introduction of the East India Railway in 1854 caused an influx of people in Howrah city. As a result, public nuisance and threat of epidemics arose. So, the Howrah Offence Act was founded in 1857 to ensure prevention of local nuisances. The district magistrate was empowered to prosecute the law breaker with a fine of Rs 200 or rigorous imprisonment of one month. But nothing changed much. Ultimately, the Governor General vouched Section No. 12 of the Act of 1858, by which the Howrah Municipality was formed with the legislative council's due approval. However, the municipal committee was dissolved after a few years. In 1862, Howrah Municipality was reorganised.

On 2 May 1864, by the Municipal District Improvement Act III (1864), the Howrah Municipality Board was formed and from 2 August 1864 it started execution vide Gazette Notification. As per the Howrah Municipal Corporation Act of 1980, Howrah became a municipal corporation.

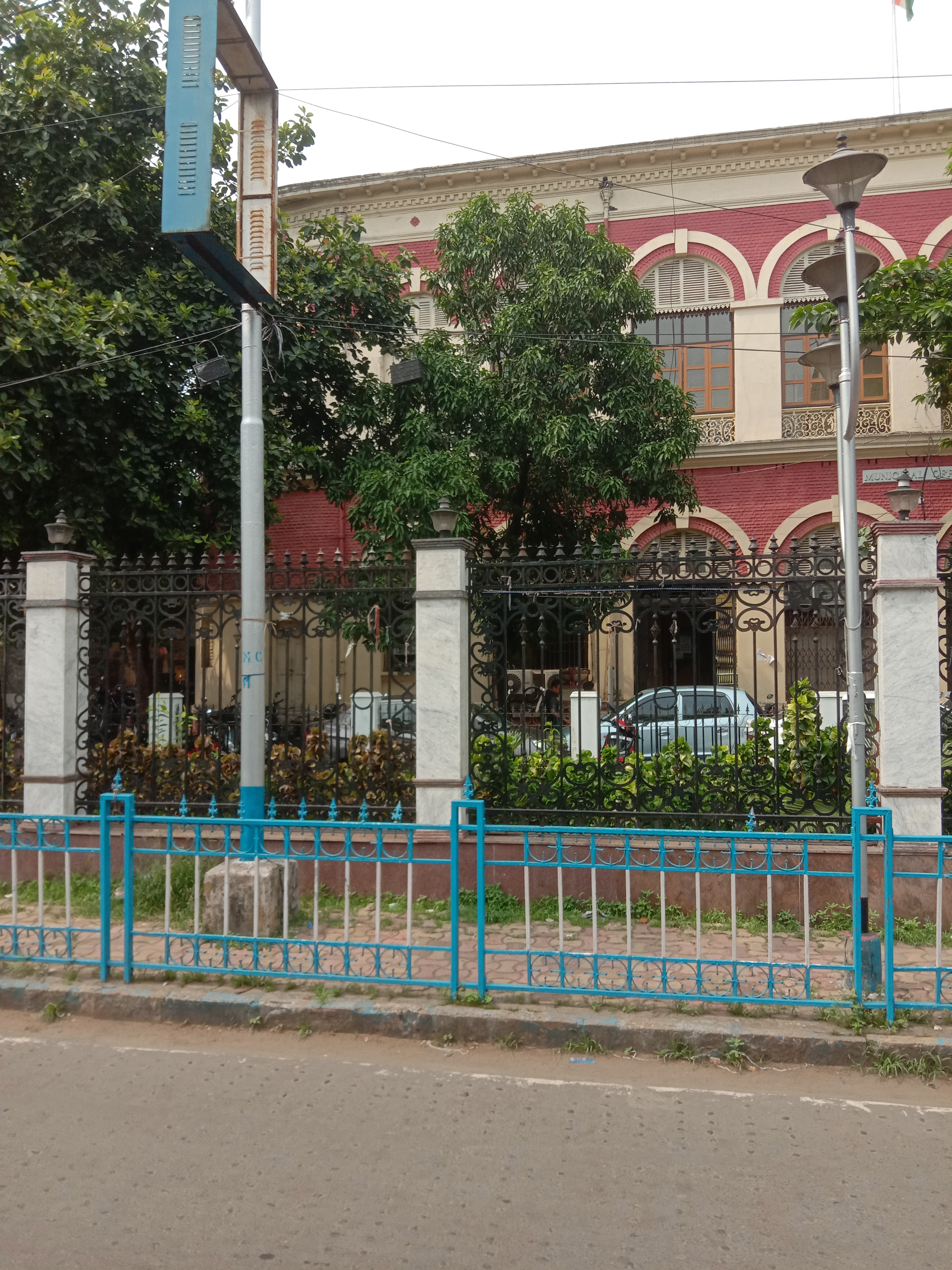
HMC building in June 2022

=== History ===
The first board comprised Mr E. C. Craster as the District Magistrate and chairman and Mr N. Macnicol as vice-chairman. The first board also comprised D. R. Bird as managing director, C. H. Denham as chief engineer, R. W. King, W Stalkartt, R. N. Barges, D W Campbell, Babu Gopal Lal Chowdhury, Babu Rajmohan Basu and Babu Kshetra Mohan Mitra as other members. The first board meeting was held on 6 May 1864. The first municipal election in Howrah took place on 1 December 1884 declaring the following commissioners from their respective wards.

Kedarnath Bhattacharya was the first Indian elected vice-chairman and chairman. In 1886, when Mr. E C Craster stepped down, Babu Upendra Chandra was elected as chairman and Baboo Kedarnath Bhattacharya was selected as vice-chairman. But due to a discrepancy in his election, Upendra Chandra's chairmanship was cancelled and Kedarnath Bhattacharya had to officiate in his position for a few years. After some years, nearly from 1890 the district magistrate was appointed as chairman till 1916 when Babu Mahendranath Roy won the election with a huge majority. He subsequently was largely responsible for the development of the city and was largely responsible for its modernisation of the city.

=== Bally Municipality ===
Bally Municipality was formed, separating it out from Howrah on 31 March 1883. In July 2015, Howrah Municipal Corporation and Bally Municipality were merged. 35 wards of the Bally Municipality were decreased to 16 under the Howrah Municipal Corporation.

In November 2021, West Bengal Legislative Assembly passed a bill to separate Bally Municipality from Howrah Municipal Corporation.

== Administration ==
The corporation area is divided into sixty-six wards. Each ward elects a councillor and each borrow elects a chairman. The Mayor-in-council, which is led by Mayor and supported by Commissioner and officers, is responsible for administration of the corporation area.

== List of Mayors ==
S. No.	Name	Term		Party
S. No.	Name	Start	End	Party
1	Alokedut Das	1984	1989	Communist Party of India (Marxist)
2	Swadesh Chakraborty	1989	1999	Communist Party of India (Marxist)
3	Subinoy Ghosh	1999	2000	Communist Party of India (Marxist)
4	Gopal Mukherjee	2000	2008	Communist Party of India (Marxist)
5	Mamata Jaiswal	2008	2013	Communist Party of India (Marxist)
6	Rathin Chakravarty	2013	2018	Trinamool Congress

== Current members ==
Mayor: Vacant
Deputy Mayor: Vacant
Assembly	Ward Details	Councillor	Party	Remarks
Howrah Uttar	Ward No. 1			
Howrah Uttar	Ward No. 2			
Howrah Uttar	Ward No. 3			
Howrah Uttar	Ward No. 4			
Howrah Uttar	Ward No. 5			
Howrah Uttar	Ward No. 6			
Howrah Uttar	Ward No. 7			
Howrah Uttar	Ward No. 8			
Shibpur	Ward No. 9			
Shibpur	Ward No. 10			
Shibpur	Ward No. 11			
Shibpur	Ward No. 12			
Shibpur	Ward No. 13			
Shibpur	Ward No. 14			
Shibpur	Ward No. 15			
Howrah Uttar	Ward No. 16			
Howrah Uttar	Ward No. 17			
Howrah Uttar	Ward No. 18			
Howrah Uttar	Ward No. 19			
Howrah Uttar	Ward No. 20			
Howrah Uttar	Ward No. 21			
Howrah Uttar	Ward No. 22			
Howrah Uttar	Ward No. 23			
Howrah Uttar	Ward No. 24			
Howrah Madhya	Ward No. 25			
Howrah Madhya	Ward No. 26			
Howrah Madhya	Ward No. 27			
Howrah Madhya	Ward No. 28			
Shibpur	Ward No. 29			
Shibpur	Ward No. 30			
Shibpur	Ward No. 31			
Shibpur	Ward No. 32			
Shibpur	Ward No. 33			
Shibpur	Ward No. 34			
Howrah Dakshin	Ward No. 35			
Howrah Dakshin	Ward No. 36			
Howrah Dakshin	Ward No. 37			
Howrah Dakshin	Ward No. 38			
Howrah Dakshin	Ward No. 39			
Howrah Dakshin	Ward No. 40			
Howrah Dakshin	Ward No. 41			
Howrah Dakshin	Ward No. 42			
Shibpur	Ward No. 43			
Howrah Madhya	Ward No. 44			
Howrah Madhya	Ward No. 45			
Howrah Madhya	Ward No. 46			
Howrah Madhya	Ward No. 47			
Howrah Madhya	Ward No. 48			
Howrah Madhya	Ward No. 49			
Howrah Madhya	Ward No. 50			
Howrah Madhya	Ward No. 51			
Howrah Madhya	Ward No. 52			
Howrah Madhya	Ward No. 53			
Howrah Madhya	Ward No. 54			
Howrah Madhya	Ward No. 55			
Howrah Madhya	Ward No. 56			
Howrah Madhya	Ward No. 57			
Howrah Madhya	Ward No. 58			
Howrah Madhya	Ward No. 59			
Howrah Madhya	Ward No. 60			
Howrah Madhya	Ward No. 61			
Howrah Madhya	Ward No. 62			
Howrah Dakshin	Ward No. 63			
Howrah Dakshin	Ward No. 64			
Howrah Dakshin	Ward No. 65			
Howrah Dakshin	Ward No. 66			
Howrah Dakshin	Ward No. 67			
Howrah Dakshin	Ward No. 68			

== Services ==
The HMC is responsible for administering and providing basic infrastructure to the city.

- Water purification and supply
- Sewage treatment and disposal
- Garbage disposal and street cleanliness
- Solid waste management
- Building and maintenance of roads, streets and flyovers.
- Street lighting
- Maintenance of parks and open spaces
- Cemeteries and Crematoriums
- Registering of births and deaths
- Conservation of heritage sites
- Disease control, including immunization
- Public municipal schools etc.

== Elections ==
=== 2026 ===
S. No.	Party		Councillors	Change
S. No.	Name	Flag	Councillors	Change
1.	BJP		TBA	Steady
2.	CPI(M)		TBA	Steady
3.	INC		TBA	Steady
4.	MAITC		TBA	Steady
Wards			68	

==== 2015 Bally ====
In October 2015, elections to 16 wards of newly merged Bally Municipality were held, with Trinamool Congress winning all 16 wards.

=== 2013 ===
S. No.	Party		Councillors	Change
S. No.	Name	Flag	Councillors	Change
1.	AITC		42	▲35
2.	INC		4	▼5
3.	CPI(M)		2	▼24
4.	BJP		2	▲1
Wards			50	

=== 2008 ===
S. No.	Party		Alliance	Councillors		Change
S. No.	Name	Flag	Alliance	Party	Alliance	Change
1.	CPI(M)		Left Front	26	33	Steady
2.	CPI		Left Front	3	33	Steady
3.	AIFB		Left Front	2	33	Steady
4.	RSP		Left Front	1	33	Steady
5.	JD(S)		Left Front	1	33	Steady
6.	INC		None	9		Steady
7.	AITC		None	7		Steady
8.	BJP		None	1		Steady
Wards				50		

== Sources ==
- O'Malley, L. S. S.; Chakravarti, Monmohan (1909). Bengal District Gazetteers: Howrah. Bengal Secretariat Book Depot.
