= Laxmi Ratan Shukla =

Indian politician

Member of West Bengal Legislative Assembly
- In office 19 May 2016 – 4 May 2021
- Preceded by: Ashok Ghosh
- Succeeded by: Gautam Chowdhuri
- Constituency: Howrah Uttar

Minister of State for Youth Services and Sports, Government of West Bengal
- In office 27 May 2016 – 5 January 2021
- Governor: Jagdeep Dhankhar; Keshari Nath Tripathi
- Chief Minister: Mamata Banerjee

Personal details
- Party: All India Trinamool Congress (2016–2021)
- Cricket career

Personal information
- Born: 6 May 1981 (age 45); Howrah, West Bengal, India
- Nickname: Bittu
- Batting: Right-handed
- Bowling: Right-arm medium-fast
- Role: All-rounder

International information
- National side: India
- ODI debut (cap 119): 22 March 1999 v Sri Lanka
- Last ODI: 5 September 1999 v West Indies

Domestic team information
- Years: Team
- 1997/98–2015/16: Bengal
- 2008–2013: Kolkata Knight Riders
- 2014: Delhi Daredevils

Career statistics
Competition	ODI	FC	LA	T20
Matches	3	137	141	81
Runs scored	18	6,217	2,997	994
Batting average	9.0	35.93	30.27	20.70
100s/50s	0/0	9/37	4/13	0/3
Top score	13	250	151	76
Balls bowled	114	12,820	5,223	976
Wickets	1	172	143	47
Bowling average	94.00	34.75	27.62	24.61
5 wickets in innings	0	3	1	0
10 wickets in match	0	0	0	0
Best bowling	1/25	6/86	5/34	3/6
Catches/stumpings	1/–	60/–	53/–	31/–
- Source: ESPNcricinfo, 17 November 2016

Laxmi Ratan Shukla (born 6 May 1981) is a former Indian cricketer and politician. He played as a right-handed middle-order batsman and a right-arm medium-pace bowler for the Bengal cricket team. He was also a player for Kolkata Knight Riders and Delhi Daredevils in the Indian Premier League. He was a member of the legislative assembly of West Bengal representing the Trinamool Congress. He resigned from the ministry on 5 January 2021.

== Early life ==
Shukla was born in Howrah, West Bengal, and did his schooling at Shree Hanumaan Jute Mill Hindi High School and the Don Bosco High & Technical School, Liluah. He made his first-class debut in the Ranji Trophy during the 1997–98 season, and was selected by India for the 1998 Under-19 Cricket World Cup. He was a part of the Bengal team in the Wills Trophy, in which they got to the semi-final. In 2000 he was picked for the National Cricket Academy.

On 30 December 2015 he announced his retirement from all forms of cricket.

== International career ==
Because of impressive performances at the domestic level, Shukla received a national call in 1999. He was dropped in favour of Ashish Nehra in the first Test he was selected to play, against Sri Lanka at Colombo in the Asian Test Championship, even after his name appeared in the 11-member squad flashed on the electronic scoreboard at the ground. He made his ODI debut against Sri Lanka on 22 March 1999 in Nagpur. He played his last ODI against West Indies in 1999.

In fact he did not get further chances after that season as a bowler because other young pace bowlers like Zaheer Khan and Ashish Nehra had entered and established their places in the Indian Senior team, upon the impressive performances.

Although Shukla was renowned for his skills as an all rounder, selectors gave the chances for the players like Sanjay Bangar, Hrishikesh Kanitkar and eventually Irfan Pathan pushing him down the pecking order.

== Domestic career ==
He was by far the brightest performer as Bengal (captained by Sourav Ganguly) won its first Vijay Hazare Trophy in 2012. In the group stage match against Jharkhand at Eden Gardens, he scored 151* from 96 balls (16 fours, 8 sixes) to chase down Jharkhand's score of 280/6 in just 38.1 overs. In the next match against Tripura at the Jadavpur University Sports Complex, after being bowled out to only 198 in 49 overs, he took 4/37 (and Sanjib Sanyal took 4/33 from his 8 overs) to bowl out Tripura for just 168 in 37.4 overs. In the quarter-final, he took 2/37 against Madhya Pradesh. He took the wicket of Punjab's highest scorer Mandeep Singh (66) in the semifinal. In the final against Mumbai led by Ajit Agarkar, he took 4/38 (including openers Wasim Jaffer and Ajinkya Rahane) to bowl out Mumbai for only 248, and then chased it down with a 107* off 83 ball-partnership with Anustup Majumdar. He scored 106* from 90 balls, and Anustup Majumdar scored 50* from 45 balls to win the Vijay Hazare Trophy with 23 balls to spare.

Following his success as an all rounder in the Vijay Hazare Trophy 2012, he was made the captain of Bengal in the Vijay Hazare Trophy 2013. He started the tournament brilliantly, taking 5/34 and thus restricting Odisha to only 175, and winning the match by 11 runs.

== Political career ==
He joined All India Trinamool Congress in February 2016 before 2016 West Bengal Legislative Assembly election in presence of the party supremo and Chief Minister Mamata Banerjee at a party general council meeting in Kolkata. He became candidate from Howrah Uttar constituency. He won the seat by defeating Santosh Kumar Pathak of Indian National Congress. He became the minister of State Sports and Youth Services in Mamata Banerjee's second government. Later, he was also made the president of Howrah Sadar district committee of Trinamool Congress. On 5 January 2021, he resigned as the Minister of State for Youth Services and Sports along with the aforementioned district party post.
