= Ishara Amerasinghe =

Sri Lankan cricketer

Personal information
- Full name: Merenna Koralage Don Ishara Amerasinghe
- Born: 5 March 1978 (age 48); Colombo, Sri Lanka
- Height: 6 ft 0 in (1.83 m)
- Batting: Right-handed
- Bowling: Right arm fast-medium
- Role: Bowler

International information
- National side: Sri Lanka (2007–2008)
- Only Test (cap 108): 3 April 2008 v West Indies
- ODI debut (cap 131): 18 May 2007 v Pakistan
- Last ODI: 10 April 2008 v West Indies

Domestic team information
- Years: Team
- 1997/98: Burgher Recreation Club
- 1998/99: Colts Cricket Club
- 2000/01–2002/03: Nondescripts Cricket Club
- 2003/04: Colts Cricket Club
- 2004/05: Galle Cricket Club
- 2005/06–present: Colts Cricket Club

Career statistics
Competition	Test	ODI	FC	LA
Matches	1	8	96	74
Runs scored	0	6	300	40
Batting average	–	–	6.52	6.66
100s/50s	0/0	0/0	0/0	0/0
Top score	0*	5*	46	5*
Balls bowled	150	426	11,496	2,947
Wickets	1	9	242	91
Bowling average	105.00	40.33	23.76	24.32
5 wickets in innings	0	0	7	1
10 wickets in match	0	0	1	0
Best bowling	1/62	3/44	5/12	5/44
Catches/stumpings	0/–	1/–	29/–	10/–
- Source: Cricinfo, 7 March 2009

Merenna Koralage Don Ishara Amerasinghe (born 5 March 1978), or Ishara Amerasinghe, is a Sri Lankan cricketer who attended Nalanda College Colombo. A right-arm fast-medium bowler with a side-on action, Amerasinghe was named in the 30-man provincial squad for the 2007 World Cup. Samarasinghe is the 108th Sri Lanka Test Cap, where he debut against West Indies at Port of Spain West Indies in 2007/08.

== International career ==
He is probably the second fastest bowler in Sri Lanka, behind Lasith Malinga. Despite not making it to the Caribbean he was selected in the Sri Lankan squad for a post-World Cup tournament against Pakistan at Abu Dhabi in May 2007. He made his One Day International debut in the first game of the series but failed to take a wicket. However, in the 2008 CB series, also involving Australia and India, he picked up 8 wickets at 35.75 each.
