= Mrityunjoy Banerjee =

Mrityunjoy Banerjee may refer to:

- Mrityunjoy Banerjee (football player), Indian football player
- Mrityunjoy Banerjee (economist), Indian economist and politician
