= Howrah Dakshin Assembly constituency =

Howrah Dakshin
- Constituency No. 173 for the West Bengal Legislative Assembly
- Interactive Map Outlining Howrah Dakshin Assembly Constituency

Constituency details
- Country: India
- Region: East India
- State: West Bengal
- District: Howrah
- Lok Sabha constituency: Howrah
- Established: 1951
- Total electors: 294,099
- Reservation: None

Member of Legislative Assembly
- 18th West Bengal Legislative Assembly
- Incumbent Nandita Chowdhury
- Party: DTC
- Elected year: 2026

Howrah Dakshin Assembly constituency is an assembly constituency in Howrah district in the Indian state of West Bengal.

== Overview ==
As per orders of the Delimitation Commission, No. 173 Howrah Dakshin Assembly constituency is composed of the following: Ward Nos. 35 to 42 and 63 to 68 of Howrah Municipal Corporation and Duila, Jorhat, Panchpara and Thanamakua gram panchayats of Sankrail community development block.

Ward No.	Councillor	Party
35	Vacant	Vacant
36	Vacant	Vacant
37	Vacant	Vacant
38	Vacant	Vacant
39	Vacant	Vacant
40	Vacant	Vacant
41	Vacant	Vacant
42	Vacant	Vacant
63	Vacant	Vacant
64	Vacant	Vacant
65	Vacant	Vacant
66	Vacant	Vacant
67	Vacant	Vacant
68	Vacant	Vacant

Howrah South Assembly constituency is part of No. 25 Howrah Lok Sabha constituency.

== Members of the Legislative Assembly ==
=== Howrah South ===
Year	Name	Party
1951	Beni Charan Dutta	Indian National Congress
1957	Kanai Lal Bhattacharya	All India Forward Bloc
1962	Kanai Lal Bhattacharya	All India Forward Bloc
1967	B. K. Bhattacharya	Indian National Congress
1969	Pralay Talukdar	Communist Party of India (Marxist)
1971	Santi Kumar Dasgupta	Indian National Congress
1972	Santi Kumar Dasgupta	Indian National Congress
1977	Pralay Talukdar	Communist Party of India (Marxist)
1982	Pralay Talukdar	Communist Party of India (Marxist)
1987	Mrityunjoy Banerjee	Indian National Congress
1991	Pralay Talukdar	Communist Party of India (Marxist)
1996	Pralay Talukdar	Communist Party of India (Marxist)
2001	Badal Basu	Communist Party of India (Marxist)
2006	Krishna Kisor Roy	Communist Party of India (Marxist)

=== Howrah Dakshin ===
Year	Name	Party
2011	Brajamohan Mazumder	Trinamool Congress
2016	Brajamohan Mazumder	Trinamool Congress
2021	Nandita Chowdhury	Trinamool Congress
2026	Nandita Chowdhury	Trinamool Congress

== Election results ==
=== 2026 ===
2026 West Bengal Legislative Assembly election: Howrah Dakshin
Party	Candidate	Votes	%	±%
AITC	Nandita Chowdhury	100,540	45.28	▼8.58
BJP	Shyamal Hati	92,712	41.75	▲11.20
CPI(M)	Abhijit Bandopadhyay	21,598	9.73	▼2.85
INC	Deepshikha Bhowmick	2,609	1.17	
NOTA	None of the above	1,574	0.71	▼0.65
Majority		7,828	3.53	▼19.78
Turnout		222,054	92.24	▲18.51
AITC hold		Swing		

=== 2021 ===
2021 West Bengal Legislative Assembly election: Howrah Dakshin
Party	Candidate	Votes	%	±%
AITC	Nandita Chowdhury	116,839	53.86	
BJP	Rantidev Sengupta	66,270	30.55	
CPI(M)	Sumitra Adhikari	27,287	12.58	
NOTA	None of the above	2,948	1.36	
Majority		50,569	23.31	
Turnout		216,940	73.73	
AITC hold		Swing		

=== 2016 ===
2016 West Bengal Legislative Assembly election: Howrah Dakshin
Party	Candidate	Votes	%	±%
AITC	Brajamohan Mazumder	93,689	47.79	
CPI(M)	Arindam Basu	77,495	39.53	
BJP	Sahana Guha Roy	16,277	8.30	
NOTA	None of the above	3,816	1.95	
BSP	Srinath Yadav	1,249	0.64	
Majority		16,194	8.26	
Turnout		1,96,208	73.58	
AITC hold		Swing		

=== 2011 ===
2011 West Bengal Legislative Assembly election: Howrah Dakshin
Party	Candidate	Votes	%	±%
AITC	Brajamohan Mazumder	1,01,066	56.06	
CPI(M)	Krishna Kishor Roy	69,644	38.63	−9.43
BJP	Pramila Singh	4,256	2.36	
IND	Sekh Abdul Momin	1,803	1.00	
IND	Biswanath Mete	828	0.46	
Majority		31,422	17.43	
Turnout		1,80,437	76.94	
AITC gain from CPI(M)		Swing	#	

.# Trinamool Congress did not contest this seat in 2006.

=== 2006 ===
In the 2006 state assembly elections, Krishna Kisor Ray of CPI(M) won 164 Howrah South assembly seat defeating his nearest rival Amitava Dutta of JD(U). Contests in most years were multi cornered but only winners and runners are being mentioned. Badal Basu of CPI(M) defeated Arup Ray of Trinamool Congress in 2001. Pralay Talukdar of CPI(M) defeated Arup Roy of Congress in 1996, BJP's candidate Ambooj Sharma secured 10,237 votes, and Mrityunjoy Banerjee of Congress in 1991. Mrityunjoy Banerjee of Congress defeated Pralay Talukdar of CPI(M) in 1987. Pralay Talukdar of CPI(M) defeated Amiya Kumar Dutta of Congress in 1982 and Ambica Banerjee of Congress in 1977.

=== 1972 ===
Santi Kumar Dasgupta of Congress won in 1972 and 1971. Pralay Talukdar of CPI(M) won in 1969. B.K.Bhattacharya of Congress won in 1967. Kanai Lal Bhattacharya of Forward Bloc won in 1962 and 1957. Beni Charan Dutta of Congress won in 1951.
