= Ashok Ghosh (TMC politician) =

Indian politician

MLA of Howrah Uttar
- In office 1982–1991
- Preceded by: Chittabrata Majumdar
- Succeeded by: Lagan Deo Singh
- In office 2011–2016
- Preceded by: Lagan Deo Singh
- Succeeded by: Laxmi Ratan Shukla

Personal details
- Born: 21 January 1942
- Died: 13 January 2017 (aged 74)
- Party: All India Trinamool Congress

Ashok Ghosh was an Indian politician belonging to All India Trinamool Congress. He was elected as a member of West Bengal Legislative Assembly from Howrah Uttar in 1982, 1987 and 2011. He died on 13 January 2017.
