= Bally Municipality =

Local civic body in Bally, Howrah, West Bengal, India

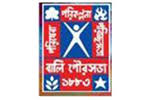
- Coat of Arms

Type
- Type: Municipality

History
- Founded: 1883; 143 years ago (established); 2021; 5 years ago (re-established)
- Disbanded: 2015; 11 years ago (then re-established)
- Preceded by: Howrah Municipal Corporation (till 2021)

Leadership
- Chairman: Vacant

Website
- www.myhmc.in

Bally Municipality is the body responsible for the civic infrastructure and administration of the town of Bally, West Bengal, India. Bally is a Municipality city in district of Howrah, West Bengal. The Bally city is divided into 35 wards for which elections are held every 5 years. Bally is the northern suburb of the city of Howrah. Bally Municipality was initially formed by separating it from Howrah Municipality in 1883. As of 2015 Bally Municipality had been re-merged with Howrah Municipal Corporation (HMC). Bally Municipality was again separated from HMC on 12 November 2021.

== History ==
The Bally Municipality was established on 1 April 1883 from the northern 35 wards of the Howrah Municipality. It administered an area of 11.81 square kilometres (4.56 sq mi) that included Bally, Belur, Liluah and other nearby areas.

The water tank in Saraswati Pathagar, commonly known as Bally Municipality Water Tank was established by a committee led by the local councillor of Bally ward no. 5, Sabyasachi Chatterjee. He was also the pioneer of drinking water distribution in the area and also the person to establish a connection of water supply from Serampore to Bally.

The Bally Municipality was destablished on 10 July 2015 and merged with Howrah Municipal Corporation.

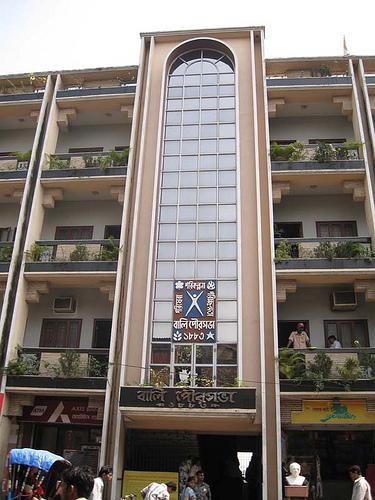
Building of Bally Municipality

Bally Municipality was re-established on 12 November 2021.

== Demographics ==
In 2001 the municipality had a total population of 261,575, a rise of 41.43% since the 1991 census. Females constituted 42.72% of the population. The sex ratio was 744 females per 1000 males, which may be due to the large number of migrant labours who inhabit the municipality to work in the industries in Bally and nearby areas of Liluah and Belur. The overall literacy in the area stands was 81.91% in 2001 (rising from 75.31% in 1991), of which male literacy was 85.17% (79.25% in 1991) and female literacy was 77.43% (rising from 69.21% in 1991). In 2011 the total population was 293,373.

=== Languages ===
Languages spoken in Bally city (2011)
1. Bengali (45.1%)
2. Hindi (40.9%)
3. Urdu (9.07%)
4. Odia (1.55%)
5. Bhojpuri (0.69%)
6. Marwari (0.52%)
7. Others (2.12%)

== Controversies ==
On 14 August 2015 a sub-assistant engineer of the municipality was arrested after an investigation by the State Anti Corruption Bureau and the police recovered cash worth ₹20.07 crore, post office deposits of ₹58 lakh and jewellery worth ₹14 lakh from his house.

== Disestablishment ==
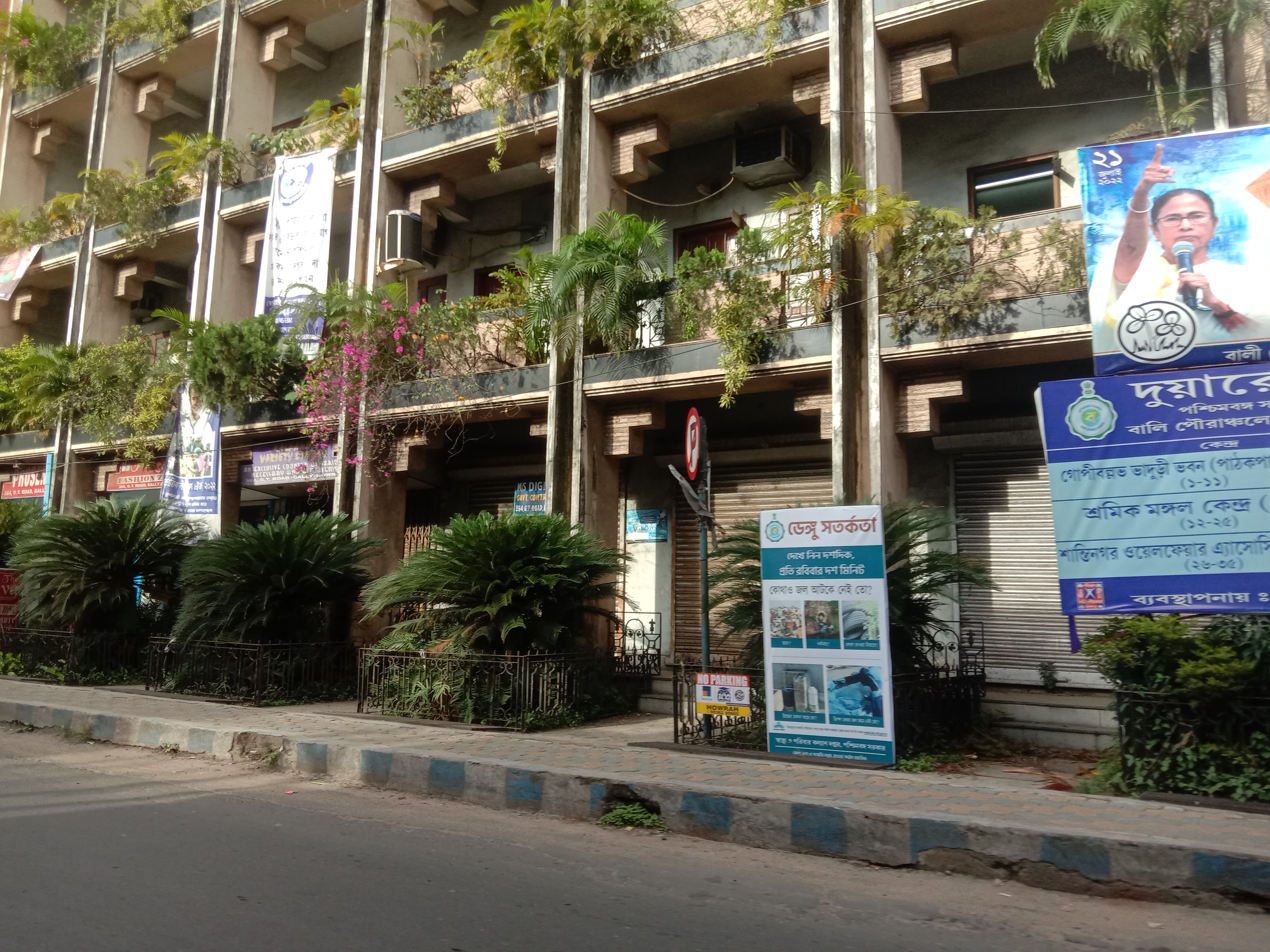
Bally Municipality building August 2022

The Bally Municipality was disestablished on 10 July 2015 and merged with Howrah Municipal Corporation. This merger was a brainchild of Chief Minister Mamata Banerjee to allow planned and organized development in Howrah to transform it into a megacity. The 35 wards of the municipality were reduced to 16 wards; the by-election to choose the new councillors for these wards was held on 3 September 2015.

== Re-establishment ==
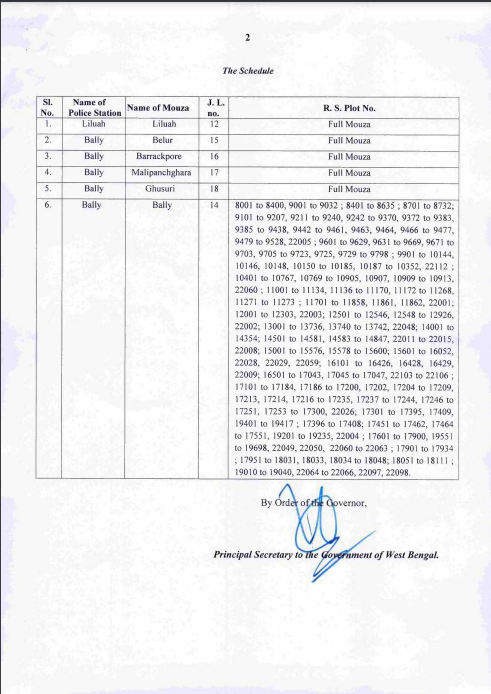
Police Stations, Mouzas, their J.L. numbers and R.S. plot numbers under Bally Municipality

The Bally Municipality was re-established on 12 November 2021. This move was taken after a plethora of long-drawn dissatisfactions regarding the merger act. The residents of Bally had to travel 8 kilometres in order to get their civic and municipal works done. Even more, there were several reports of slothfulness and dormant behaviour on part of the Howrah Municipal Corporation. However, it was decided that the polls in Bally Municipality would not be conducted on 19 December 2021, along with HMC and KMC elections. Bally Municipality has been classified a Group A Municipality, in accordance with the Census of 2011. It will have 35 wards under it, as it had been having previously, before the aforementioned merger. A list of Mouzas under the municipality has been attached herewith. The Sub-divisional Officer, Howrah Sadar, has been appointed as the Administrator in the Bally Municipality with effect from 12 November 2021. However, the plan to conduct the Municipal Corporation election of Howrah on 19 December could not be implemented as West Bengal Governor Jagdeep Dhankhar refused to sign the bill on the formation of Bally Municipality. Finally on 23 December, the State Election Commission of West Bengal informed the Calcutta High Court that Dhankhar had signed the bill. However, two days later the Governor denied the news of signing the bill.
