= 2007–08 Commonwealth Bank Series =

- Date: 3 February 2008 – 4 March 2008
- Location: Australia
- Result: India Won by (2–0 in final series)
- Player of the series: Nathan Bracken (Aus)
Teams
Australia	India	Sri Lanka
Captains
Ricky Ponting	MS Dhoni	Mahela Jayawardene
Most runs
Gilchrist 322 Clarke 314 Hayden 298	Gambhir 440; Tendulkar 399; Dhoni 347	Sangakkara 326; Jayawardene 214; Dilshan 170
Most wickets
Bracken 21 Lee 16 Johnson 11	I Sharma 14; Pathan 11; Kumar 10	Malinga 12; Amerasinghe 9 Murali 9

The 2007–08 edition of the Commonwealth Bank Series was a One Day International cricket tournament held in Australia. The Commonwealth Bank Series is an annual event involving the national teams of Australia, India and Sri Lanka. India won the event with a 2–0 sweep of the hosts in the final series.

The first two matches of the series were shaping up for excellent contests after their first innings. However heavy rain in Brisbane, caused by a cyclone in the Pacific Ocean, saw both of those matches abandoned. Australia was the first to win a match in the series after a Sri Lankan collapse in game 3.

Australia was the best team during the regular matches, taking 4 wins with bonus points. However India defeated Australia 2–0 in the best of 3 final series to win the tournament. This was the second time in a row that Australia lost their home tri-nations' series. In the previous year they had lost to England. Fast bowler Nathan Bracken was the leading wicket taker in the tournament with 21 wickets and was named Player of the Series. Australian wicketkeeper Adam Gilchrist and left-arm spinner Brad Hogg retired from One Day International after the second final.

== Squads ==
Squads
Australia	India	Sri Lanka
Ricky Ponting (c)	MS Dhoni (c & wk)	Mahela Jayawardene (c)
Adam Gilchrist (wk)	Sachin Tendulkar	Kumar Sangakkara (wk)
Nathan Bracken	Yuvraj Singh	Ishara Amerasinghe
Stuart Clark	Virender Sehwag	Tillakaratne Dilshan
Michael Clarke	Dinesh Karthik	Sanath Jayasuriya
Brad Haddin	Robin Uthappa	Chamara Kapugedera
Matthew Hayden	Gautam Gambhir	Nuwan Kulasekara
Brad Hogg	Suresh Raina	Farveez Maharoof
James Hopes	Rohit Sharma	Lasith Malinga
Michael Hussey	Irfan Pathan	Muttiah Muralitharan
Mitchell Johnson	Praveen Kumar	Dilruwan Perera
Brett Lee	Munaf Patel	Chamara Silva
Andrew Symonds	Ishant Sharma	Upul Tharanga
Ashley Noffke	Sreesanth	Chaminda Vaas
Adam Voges	Harbhajan Singh	Chanaka Welegedara
	Piyush Chawla	
	Manoj Tiwary	

Note: Ashley Noffke and Adam Voges were standby players.

Full statistics of the tri-series

== Group stage table ==
Group stage
Pos	Team	Pld	W	L	T	NR	BP	Pts	NRR	For	Against
1	Australia	8	5	2	0	1	4	26	0.769	1477/329.3	1208/325.2
2	India	8	3	3	0	2	1	17	0.121	1184/248.2	1250/269
3	Sri Lanka	8	2	5	0	1	0	10	−0.949	1167/298.3	1370/282

Source: Cricinfo

== Group stage matches ==
=== 1st match: Australia v India ===
3 February
13:15 (D/N)
(scorecard)

India; 194 (45/45 overs)	v	Australia; 3/51 (7.2/26 overs)
Gambhir 39 (51); Lee 5–27 (9 overs)		Hopes 17 (12); Sreesanth 2–17 (3.2 overs)

Match abandoned
The Gabba, Brisbane
Umpires: Steve Davis (AUS) and Rudi Koertzen (SA)

- Rain after 36 overs stopped play, India's innings reduced to 45 overs. Australia's Innings reduced to 43 overs before commencement with a target of 192. Rain after 4 overs stopped play, Australia's innings reduced to 26 overs with the target reduced of 141. Rain after 7.2 overs stopped play, the match was then abandoned.

India won the toss and elected to bat on what was thought to be a bowlers pitch due to earlier rain and high chance of further showers. Sehwag was bowled early by Bracken off an inside edge. Tendulkar was forced onto the back foot by Lee bowling short, and accidentally hit the stumps with his back foot to be out hit wicket, putting India at 2/26 after 6.3 overs. Gambhir and Rohit Sharma then combined for 65 runs taking advantage of wide and short bowling from debutant Ashley Noffke. Gambhir was dropped twice in the slips off Johnson, but Johnson eventually got him LBW which triggered a middle order collapse. Sharma fine edged Lee through to Gilchrist. Next to go was Tiwary who struggled against the pace of Lee and was clean bowled by a yorker. Uthappa then skied a short ball from Noffke and was caught by Clarke at point. India had lost 4 wickets for just 11 runs, collapsing from 2/92 to 6/102 after 26.1 overs. Dhoni and Pathan tightened up, determined to make sure India bat out the innings and post a competitive score. Rain then stopped the play with India at 6/128 after 36 overs.

Play resumed over an hour later, with the match reduced by 5 overs per innings. The Indian batters came out firing, scoring boundaries. Pathan appeared to edge through to Gilchrist but the umpire was unmoved. Ponting then ran out Pathan with a throw from cover leaving India at 7/147 after 38.6 overs. Harbhajan Singh belted 27 from 18 balls, mainly off Bracken, before skying to point off the toe of the bat. Dhoni fell just a few balls previously, trying to hit over cover. Brett Lee claiming both wickets for a 5 wicket haul. Sreesanth tried to steal a third run off the last ball after a miss-field but was easily run-out. India all out for 194 off the full 45 overs. Brett Lee finished with 5 for 29 off 9 overs. Australia was set 196 runs to win via D/L method (since India had batted 36 overs while pacing for 50 overs).

Further rain during the break reduced Australia's innings to 43 overs, with a revised target of 192. Hopes smashed four 4's off the 3rd over (bowled by Pathan) before Gilchrist gloved a hook shot to the keeper. He walked off, without even looking at the umpire who had shaken his head to dismiss the appeal. Yet more rain arrived with the score 1/33 after 4.0 overs. Australia's innings was reduced to 22 overs with the target set to 141 and play resumed again, although everyone expected more rain soon which would cause the match to be abandoned. Hopes was clean bowled by Ishant Sharma and then Ponting edged Sreesanth to 2nd slip, Australia losing 3 for 6 runs to be 3/39 after just 5.2 overs. The rain arrived after 7.2 overs with the score 3/51. With rain falling and not enough time remaining to complete the minimum 20 overs, the match was abandoned as a draw. Both teams were awarded 2 points-a-piece.

=== 2nd match: India v Sri Lanka ===
5 February
13:15 (D/N)
(scorecard)

India; 4/267 (50 overs)	v	Sri Lanka
Gambhir 102* (101); Muralitharan 2–51 (10 overs)

Match abandoned
The Gabba, Brisbane
Umpires: Steve Davis (AUS) and Rudi Koertzen (SA)

- Rain prevented the second innings from starting.

India won the toss and elected to bat first, as rain was expected to hit later in the day. Yuvraj Singh was back in Indian side, after missing the first match due to an injury. The openers made a solid start putting on 68 runs in 14.3 overs before Tendulkar was bowled by Malinga. Sehwag was then taken by Amerasinghe. This was followed by the quick loss of both Yuvraj Singh and Rohit Sharma, both to Muralitharan, leaving India in trouble at 4/83 after 20.5 overs. Gambhir and Dhoni then played a solid and defensive game for the next twenty overs before they opened up in the last 10 overs scoring over 100 runs. The hallmark of their partnership was their aggressive running between the wickets. Gambhir brought up his run-a-ball century in just the last over. Vass ended up going for an expensive 0/72 from his ten overs. India finished the innings 4/267 just as rain started to fall. The rain got heavier during the break and continued all night, forcing the match to be abandoned.

=== 3rd match: Australia v Sri Lanka ===
8 February
14:15 (D/N)
(scorecard)

Australia; 6/253 (50 overs)	v	Sri Lanka; 125 (31.3 overs)
Clarke 77* (86); Vaas 2–34 (10 overs)		Sangakkara 42 (41); Bracken 5–46 (8.3 overs)

Australia won by 128 runs
Sydney Cricket Ground, Sydney
Umpires: Tony Hill (NZ) & Simon Taufel (Aus)
Player of the match: (Australia) Nathan Bracken

Ponting won the toss and elected to bat. Hayden returned from injury to open, he was the first to fall, holing Amerasinghe straight to cover, after a 64 run opening partnership from 79 balls. Ponting edged Vaas to first slip to be out for just 9 runs. Clarke then combined with Gilchrist, who scored a half century before being trapped LBW by Kapugedera. Symonds smashed straight to cover and was taken off Vaas, then Hussey hit straight to point and was also caught. However the wickets only came slowly with Australia at 5–190 after 41.4 overs. Clarke and Hopes finished the innings well after it looked like Australia could stumble to a lower score. Clarke finished not out on 77 from 86 balls, while Hopes belted 34 from 29 balls to help boost Australia to 6/253 from the full 50 overs. Vaas was the best bowler with 2/34 from 10 overs, Amerasinghe also took 2 wickets, but for 66 runs. Australia played tight against Muralitharan, who ended on up 0/42, he was later injured in the field when a ball bounced off his hands and smashed into his teeth.

Jayasuriya was first to go for Sri Lanka, dragging Lee onto his stumps. Tharanga fell without improving the score when he edged Bracken to the keeper, Sri Lanka 2–18 from 5.1 overs. Sangakkara came out firing scoring an impressive 42 from just 41 balls before being caught LBW by Bracken. Jayawardene had fallen just before while edging Johnson to the keeper. Silva struggled to score and eventually edged a flipper from Hogg to the keeper managing just 7 runs from 32 balls. Dilshan played wild shots, smashing a huge six before skying a Bracken ball to mid-off. Kapugedera had also edged Bracken to Hayden at first slip, leaving Sri Lanka in tatters at 7/93 after 23.5 overs. Malinga was run-out is unusual circumstances, he grounded the bat behind the crease, but then dropped his bat. The ball hit then stumps before he grounded his feet behind the crease and after he dropped the bat. Ponting then ran-out Vaas after a mix-up with Murali. Murali then went slogging, smashing a six down the ground before being caught at mid-on. Sri Lanka all out for just 125 runs after 31.3 overs. The 128 runs victory was large enough for Australia to earn a series bonus point. Bracken took 5/47. Johnson, Hopes and Hogg all played well, conceding just 9, 15 and 17 runs from 5 or 6 overs each.

=== 4th match: Australia v India ===
10 February
14:15 (D/N)
scorecard

Australia; 159 (43.1 overs)	v	India; 5/160 (45.5 overs)
Hussey 65* (88); I Sharma 4/38 (9.1 overs)		Tendulkar 44 (54); Johnson 2/24 (10 overs)

India won by 5 wickets.
Melbourne Cricket Ground, Melbourne
Umpires: Simon Taufel (Aus) & Rudi Koertzen (SA)
Player of the match: (India) Ishant Sharma

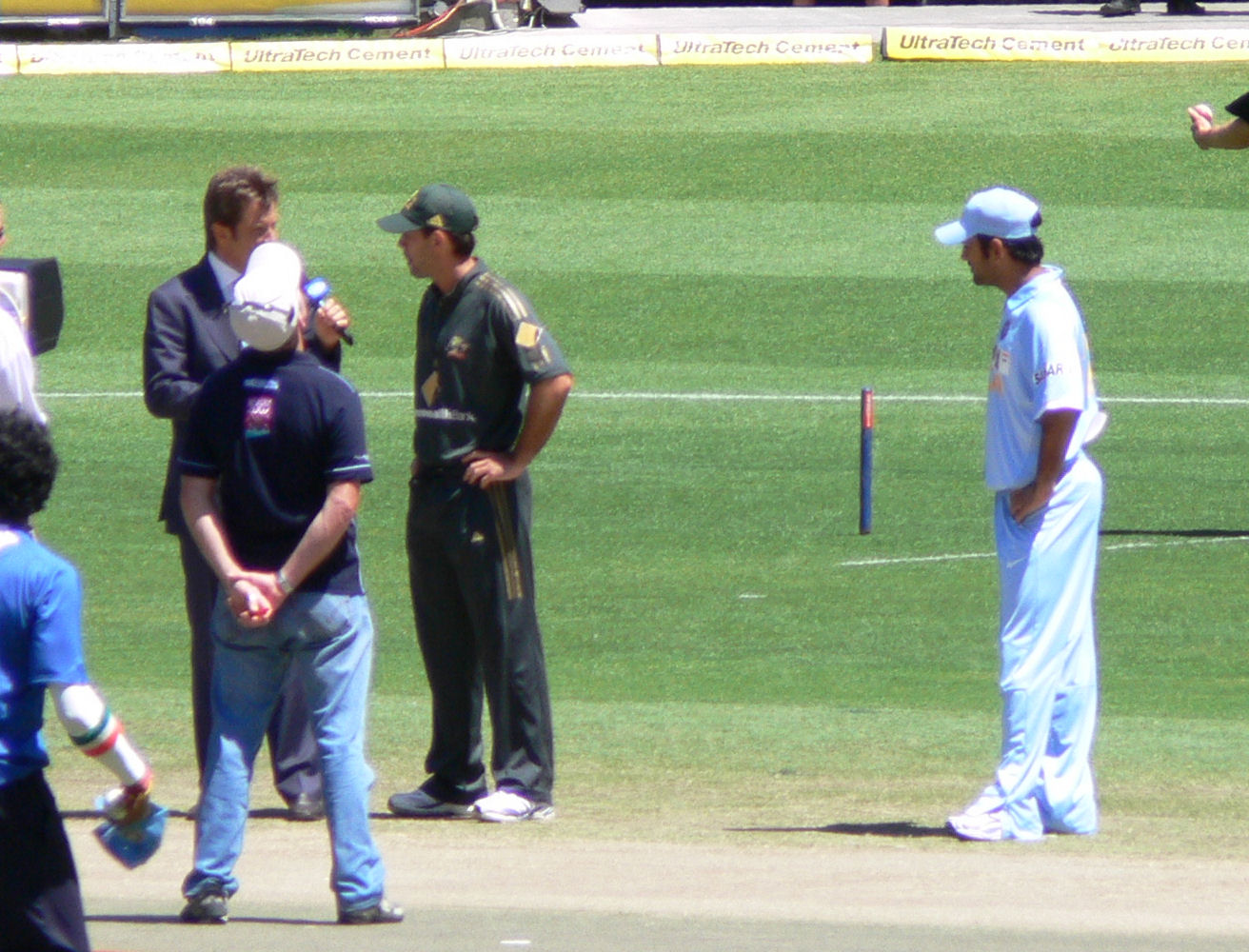
Dhoni and Ponting at the toss

Ponting won the toss and immediately elected to bat. Gilchrist was incorrectly given out LBW off Sreesanth on just the 4th ball of the day after getting an inside edge onto his pads. Hayden then smashed 25 from 21 balls before being caught at slip, leaving Australia at 2/37 after 5.2 overs. He had earlier edged over slips twice. Ponting edged a defensive bat to slip, then Clarke was caught at short mid wicket after walking across his stumps. Symonds also nicked a ball, to be caught brilliantly by wicketkeeper Dhoni, then Haddin was stumped from a wide delivery down leg side. Australia sunk to 6/92 after 25.5 overs with the tail now exposed. Lee survived 35 balls to support Hussey, but eventually edged Pathan to first slip. Johnson, Bracken and Clark were cleaned up for just 8 runs. This left Hussey stranded on 65 not out. Australia all out for just 159 runs after 43.1 overs. Sharma took 4/38 and Sreesanth took 3/31, both from 9 overs.

Australia needed wickets early, but it was Tendulkar scoring early boundaries to get India away to a great run a ball start. Bracken appeared to take Sehwag plumbed LBW on the replays, but it was given not out. A couple of balls later Bracken took Sehwag LBW again and was given out, despite replays showing it would have bounced well over the stumps. The bad umpiring continued when Tendulkar edged through to Gilchrist, but was given not out. Yet another umpiring mistake was made just a couple of balls later when Pathan was given out LBW, replays showing he inside edged, leaving India at 2–54 after 11.2 overs. Next Gambhir, Tendulkar and Yuvraj Singh were all caught, India looking shaky at 5–102 are 28.3 overs. Australia's bowling was tight (Clark 1/26 from 10, Johnson 2/24 from 10), but the job of defending such a meager target proved too much. Rohit Sharma (39 from 61) and Dhoni (17 from 54) combined well for a great winning partnership under a lot of pressure. India reached home with 5 wickets and 25 balls to spare.

=== 5th match: India v Sri Lanka ===
12 February
10:00
scorecard

India; 5/195 (29 overs)	v	Sri Lanka; 2/154 (19 overs)
R Sharma 70* (64); Maharoof 1/33 (6 overs)		Dilshan 62* (59); H Singh 1/15 (4 overs)

Sri Lanka won by 8 wickets (D/L Method)
Manuka Oval, Canberra
Umpires: Tony Hill (NZ) and Bruce Oxenford (Aus)
Player of the match: (Sri Lanka) Tillakaratne Dilshan

- Rain delayed the start of play. The game was reduced to 29 overs per side. Rain during the break further reduced Sri Lanka's innings to 21 overs, with a target of 154 to win.

Early rain prevented the start of play, and the match was reduced to 29 overs per side when Sri Lanka won the toss and decided to put India in to bat. After a run-a-ball start, both Sehwag and Tendulkar were caught at third man while playing aggressive shots, India 2/49 after 8.2 overs. Rohit Sharma and Gautam Gambhir combined for 64 runs off 70 balls, before Gambhir was run out backing up. Sharma and Dhoni then teamed up for an impressive 68 from just 46 balls before Dhoni was also run out, India 4–181 off 27.4 overs. Yuvraj Singh chipped a ball to extra cover and India finished up 5/195 after the full 29 overs. Maharoof was the only bowler to go for less than 1 run per ball achieving 1/33 from 6 overs. Malinga was the most expensive going for 45 runs from 6 overs.

Jayasuriya got Sri Lanka away to an explosive start, smashing 2 sixes in the 3rd over off Sreesanth. 22 runs were scored in that over alone. Jayasuriya reached 27 runs from just 12 balls before gloving a pull shot to the keeper, Sri Lanka 1/45 after just 3.5 overs. Sangakkara was caught off Harbhajan Singh a few overs later. Dilshan (63* runs from 59 balls) and Jayawardene (36* from 35 balls) combined for an 85-run partnership to steer Sri Lanka to a comfortable 8 wicket victory with 2 overs to spare. Sreesanth ended up going for 48 runs off just 18 deliveries. Singh was the only bowler to go for under a run a ball taking 1/15 from 4 overs. Sri Lanka scored at more than 8 runs per over and lost just two wickets in completing their first victory of the series.

=== 6th match: Australia v Sri Lanka ===
15 February
13:30 (D/N)
scorecard

Australia; 236 (49.4 overs)	v	Sri Lanka; 173 (45.3 overs)
Gilchrist 118 (132); Malinga 4/47 (9.4 overs)		Sangakkara 80 (114); Bracken 3/21 (8 overs)

Australia won by 63 runs
WACA Ground, Perth
Umpires: D Harper, R Koertzen
Player of the match: (Australia) Adam Gilchrist

Australia won the toss and elected to bat, the out field was fast and scores were expected to be around 280+. Hayden was lost early edging to square leg. Ponting got a run-a-ball 25 before yet again edging a defensive shot to slips. Gilchrist and Clarke combined for a 105 runs before Clarke was stumped after missing a Murili Delivery. Symonds edged through to the keeper in the next over and then Gilly brought up his century. He skied a pull shot to cover to finish on 118, Australia 5–206 after 43.2 overs, a slower than expected run-rate. Hussey and Hopes both got out after skying shots and the tail fell only managing to add a few runs, Australia all out for just 236 runs. Vaas bowled all of his 10 overs early taking 1/35, and Malinga took 4/47 from 9.4 overs.

Dilshan and Jayasuriya got off to an explosive start scoring 29 runs from the first 3 overs before Jayasuriya was caught in the deep. Johnson then bowled Dilshan with help of a slight inside edge. Jayawardene kept the runs flowing but edged straight to first slip, and Silva was caught specularly by Symonds, Sri Lanka 4–76 off 14 overs. Kapugedera tried to support Sangakkara but was caught playing a shot after managing a slow 29 from 60 balls. Maharoof tried to do the same and was also caught out. Vass was out first ball when he toed his first delivery straight into the air. The tail was then cleaned up leaving Sangakkara stranded on 80 until falling to a yorker from Brett Lee. A disappointing run chase by Sri Lanka, all out for just 173 runs, giving Australia a win by 63 runs and earning them another bonus point. Johnson took 3/29 from 10 and Bracken took 3/21 from 8 overs.

=== 7th match: Australia v India ===
17 February
13:45 (D/N)
scorecard

Australia; 9/203 (50 overs)	v	India; 153 (41.2 overs)
Clarke 79 (108); Pathan 4/41 (10 overs)		Mahendra Singh Dhoni 37 (50); Johnson 3/42 (10 overs)

Australia won by 50 runs
Adelaide Oval, Adelaide
Umpires: AL Hill, PD Parker
Player of the match: (Australia) Michael Clarke

Australia won the toss and elected to bat. Sharma bowled Gilchrist and then Ponting was caught at point. Hayden was then caught behind off Pathan and then Symonds was caught out also, Australia in trouble at 4–50 off 15.4 overs. Hussey was out quickly also and Hopes was stumped when he dropped his bat bringing Australia to 6–112 after 30 overs. Clarke and Hogg combined for an important 72 run partnership before both of them and Bracken were taken in 2 overs. Australia limping home with just 203 runs. Pathan took 4/41 from 10 overs and Sharma was very good taking 2/32 from 9 overs.

Tendulkar was out LBW to Bracken on a ball that looked a little high to take the stumps, India 1–20 from 4.4 overs. Pathan and Gambhir looked to steady before Gambhir, Pathan and Sharma all fell in just 4 runs, Hopes picking up two of the wickets. In trouble at 4–59 after 15.1 overs Dhoni and Singh combined until Yuvraj was caught in the deep trying to smash Hogg for six. Dhoni was injured and had to have a runner provided whom was runout by Hayden. Uthappa tried to find boundaries after he was 9 from just 30 balls, but fell after edging to Gilchrist after Harbhajan had skied bounced off his glove to also be caught out. This left Sreesanth, Sharma and Patel with 53 runs to get off 73 balls. The task was far too great for the tail who had almost no batting experience, India all out for 153, the score so low that Australia achieved their 3rd bonus point. Gilchrist was involved in 5 dismissals, Johnson took 3 for 42 and Bracken was very tidy with 2/21 from 7.2. Hopes was also impressive with 2/16 from just 6 overs.

=== 8th match: India v Sri Lanka ===
19 February
13:45 (D/N)
scorecard

Sri Lanka; 6/238 (50 overs)	v	India; 8/239 (49.1 overs)
Sangakkara 128 (155); Patel 1/38 (9 overs)		Yuvraj Singh 76 (70); Amerasinghe 3/49 (10 overs)

India won by 2 wickets
Adelaide Oval, Adelaide
Umpires: AL Hill, PD Parker
Player of the match: (Sri Lanka) Kumar Sangakkara

The toss was won by Jayawardene, who elected to bat first and found himself in the middle quicker than expected as Sri Lanka lost two early wickets. Patel got Dilshan to edge to the keeper on just the 4th ball. Jayasuriya was then run out backing up at the non-striker's end when a straight drive from Sangakkara clipped the finger of the bowler before hitting the stumps. Sri Lanka were in early trouble at 6/2 in the third over. Sangakkara and Jayawardene then built a massive partnership of 159 runs and Sangakkara went on to score a century. Amazingly Jayawardene was then dismissed in the same way as Jayasuriya again from a Sangakkara straight drive deflecting off the bowler. Kapugedera was run out a few overs later after a mix-up putting Sri Lanka at 161/4 after 38.4 overs. Sangakkara was eventually out for 128 runs caught in the deep, and Silva also lost his wicket later trying for late runs. Sri Lanka 238/6 from the full 50 overs.

The run chase started badly for India when Tendulkar was bowled in the second over by Malinga. The poor start continued with two successive wickets which turned Indian score to 35/3 in 12th over. Yuvraj Singh's innings of 76 in 70 balls, however, put the Indian side back on track. He partnered first with Rohit Sharma and later with captain Dhoni to bring victory in sight. Sri Lanka managed to make their way back in the match by snapping 3 quick wickets. But a patient Dhoni, with his haul right till the end, made sure India won with just 5 balls remaining.

=== 9th match: Australia v Sri Lanka ===
22 February
14:15 (D/N)

Australia; 184/7 (50.0 overs)	v	Sri Lanka; 77/4 (29.3 overs)
Hussey 64* (98); Maharoof 2/20 (10 overs)		Jayawardene 27 (45); Clark 2/8 (5 overs)

Australia won by 24 runs (D/L)
Melbourne Cricket Ground, Melbourne
Umpires: Taufel, Koertzen
Player of the match: (Australia) Michael Hussey

- Rain stopped Sri Lanka's innings after 29.3 overs.

Sri Lanka won the toss and sent Australia into bat, hoping to take advantage of the DL system by expecting later rain which should help Sri Lanka if they keep Australia to a low score and don't lose early wickets. Australia's top order continued its poor form to fall to 4–54 after 21.1 overs. Clarke and Hussey combined for a 90 run partnership but all batsmen struggled to achieve any high run rate, Australia finishing just 7/184 after the full 50 overs.

With rain expected Sri Lanka didn't need early wickets to fall, but two quick wickets saw Sri Lanka 2/3 after just 3.1 overs. Trying to increase the run-rate just cost more wickets and when the rain fell Sri Lanka were 4/77, some 24 runs behind the DL target. The 24 run win was enough for Australia to earn their 4th bonus point.

=== 10th Match: Australia v India ===
24 February
14:15 (D/N)
scorecard

Australia; 7/317 (50 overs)	v	India; 299 (49.1 overs)
Ponting 124 (133); Sreesanth 2/58 (8 overs)		Gambhir 113 (119); Lee 5/59 (9.1 overs)

Australia won by 18 runs
Sydney Cricket Ground, Sydney
Umpires: Tony Hill (NZ) & Simon Taufel (Aus)
Player of the match: (Australia) Ricky Ponting

Australia won the toss and elected to bat on a good batting pitch. Gilchrist fell early when he inside edged to the keeper, but Hayden and Ponting smashed Australia to 131 after 20.3 overs before Hayden was run-out. Clarke then combined with Ponting but was caught at square-leg, Australia 3–194 after 31.4 overs. Symonds then combined with Ponting, who brought up his century in their 102 run partnership. Both fell in the dying overs trying to push the score ever higher. Hopes and Lee were both run out on the last 2 balls while backing up. Australia finishing on 7/317, no team has ever chased down such a high total at the SCG.

Tendulkar was out LBW to Brett Lee in the first over. The top order collapsed about 8 overs later with Sehwag, Sharma and Singh all edging to be caught behind, India in huge trouble at 4/51 after 10.1 overs, Clarke taking early wickets. Gambhir however scored a century and was well supported by Dhoni, Uthappa, Pathan and Harbhajan Singh. At one point India were 7/290 with 27 needed from 15 balls, but Brett Lee then took the last 3 wickets, India were all out for 299 after 49.1 overs. It was the highest ever score batting second at the SCG.

=== 11th Match: India v Sri Lanka ===
26 February
10:00
Scorecard

Sri Lanka; 179 (47.1 overs)	v	India; 3/180 (32.2 overs)
Chamara Kapugedera 57 (86); Praveen Kumar (4/31)		Sachin Tendulkar 63 (54); Dilruwan Perera (1/17)

India won by 7 wickets
Bellerive Oval, Hobart
Umpires: Rudi Koertzen (SA) and Simon Taufel (Aus)
Player of the match: Praveen Kumar (Ind)

India won the toss and elected to field on a cloudy day. Sri Lankans were bowled out for 179 after 47.1 overs. India beat Sri Lanka by 7 wickets, scoring 180 losing 3 wickets in 32.2 overs. India secured its place in the finals against Australia.

=== 12th match: Australia v Sri Lanka ===
29 February
14:15 (D/N)
scorecard

Sri Lanka; 221 (50 overs)	v	Australia; 208 (48.1 overs)
Dilshan 62 (70); Bracken 4/29 (10 overs)		Gilchrist 83 (50); Amerasinghe 3/44 (10 overs)

Sri Lanka won by 13 runs
Melbourne Cricket Ground, Melbourne
Umpires: Harper, Hill
Player of the match: (Australia) Adam Gilchrist

Mathew Hayden was dropped from the side for bringing the Australian team into disrepute after making crude comments about Indian bowler Sharma. Sri Lanka won the toss and chose to bat. It was a good team effort on a difficult pitch to get to 221. Australia were cruising at 0/107 after 14.3 overs with Gilchrist on 83 from 50 balls. But then they lost all 10 wickets for just 101 runs to lose by 14 runs. It was an embarrassing display by the top order with Ponting, Clarke, Symonds and Hussey scoring 6 runs combined. A 35-run 10th wicket stand by Brett Lee and Johnson gave Australia a late chance to win the game, but Jayasuriya bowled Lee with his only delivery of the match. The win was too little too late for Sri Lanka, who finished their tour of Australia with a record of 0–2 in tests against Australia, 1–3 in ODI's against Australia, and 1–1–2 in ODIs against India. Sri Lanka went on to tour the West Indies in late March, whilst Australia played India in the best of three final series.

== Finals ==
=== 1st final ===
2 March 2008
14:15 (D/N)
Scorecard

Australia; 8/239 (50 overs)	v	India; 4/242 (45.5 overs)
Matthew Hayden 82 (88); Harbhajan Singh 2/38 (10 overs)		Sachin Tendulkar 117 (120); James Hopes 2/42 (8.5 overs)

India won by 6 wickets
Sydney Cricket Ground, Sydney
Umpires: Rudi Koertzen (SA) and Daryl Harper (Aus)
Player of the match: Sachin Tendulkar (Ind)

Australia won the toss and decided to bat. Gilchrist and Ponting fell early and then Australia were in real trouble when Clarke was given out caught behind despite the ball hitting his pads and not his bat, Australia 3/24 after 5.5 overs. Hayden and Symonds combined for a 100 run partnership before they both fell to Harbhajan Singh. Hussey helped Australia to bat out the full 50 overs before getting out late. Brett Lee scored an important 17 from 10 balls to push Australia to 8/239 after the full 50 overs.

After a good start by India, Uthappa and Gambhir fell quickly to put India 2/54 after 12.4 overs. Singh fell putting India at 3–87, But Tendulkar and Sharma combined for a great 123 run partnership. Tendulkar got his first ODI century in Australia then Sharma fell to the next ball, India 4/210 after 41.2 overs. Australia's pace attack was totally ineffective with Lee, Johnson and Bracken unable to take any wickets. Dhoni and Tendulkar then batted out the innings easily, India winning their first ever match at the SCG. Tendulkar batted from start to finish and won man of the match with 117 not out.

=== 2nd final ===
4 March 2008
13:15 (D/N)
Scorecard

India; 9/258 (50 overs)	v	Australia; 249 (49.4 overs)
Sachin Tendulkar 91 (121); Nathan Bracken 3/31 (9 overs)		James Hopes 63 (80); Praveen Kumar 4/46 (10 overs)

India won by 9 runs
The Gabba, Brisbane
Umpires: Tony Hill (NZ) and Simon Taufel (Aus)
Player of the match: Praveen Kumar (Ind)

India won the toss and elected to bat on a track that looked like it would slow down as the day progresses. India got a good start but lost wickets quickly. Sachin Tendulkar played a composed innings of 91 in 121 balls before being caught by Ponting off a delivery by Clarke in the 40th over which lent India a defendable score of 258.

In their chase, Australia lost three early wickets Hayden and Symonds played well for the 4th wicket partnership which ended when Hayden was runout by the Yuvraj Singh / Harbhajan Singh combination in the 26th over. Symonds also got out in the same over (LBW by Harbhajan). Finally, James Hopes played a brilliant 63 to take the match down to the last over. He was the last man out. Praveen Kumar, who was also the MoM, was the pick of the bowlers with figures of 4/46 in 10 overs. India won the series without playing the last match of series by 2–0.

== Gallery ==
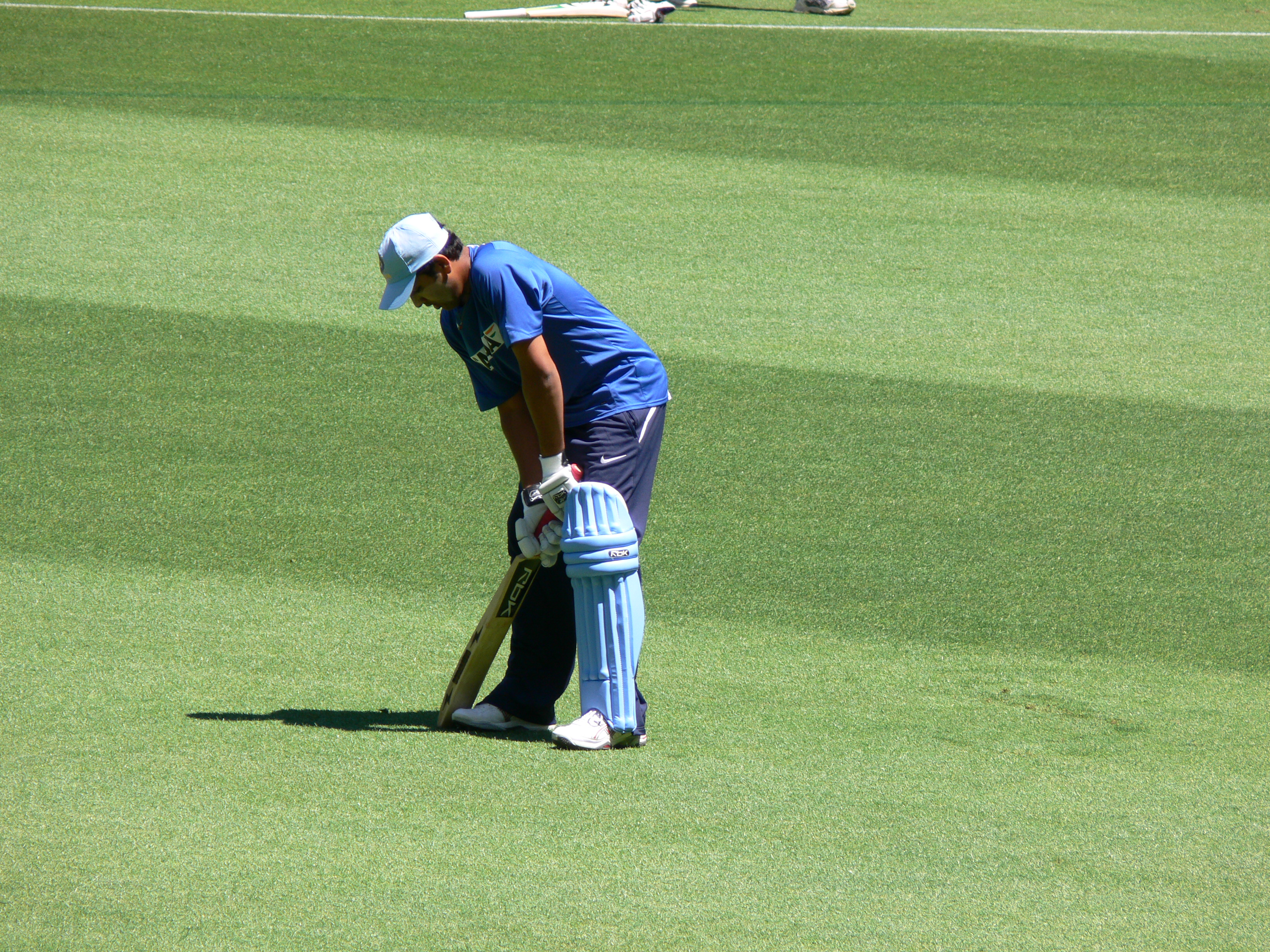
Rohit Sharma warming up before the 4th ODI between Australia and India on 10 Feb 2008 at the MCG

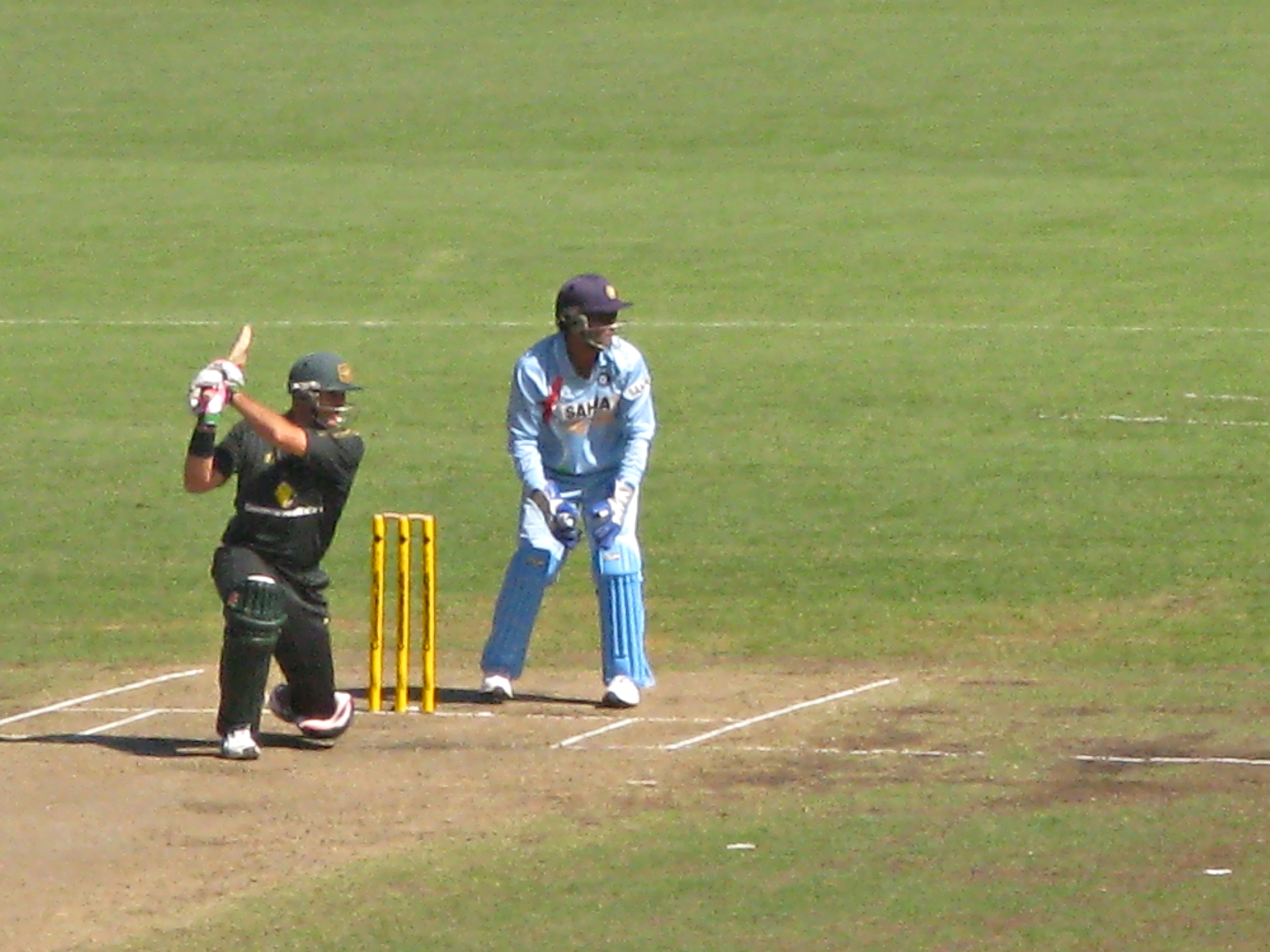
Matthew Hayden smashing Irfan Pathan for another boundary as Dhoni looks on

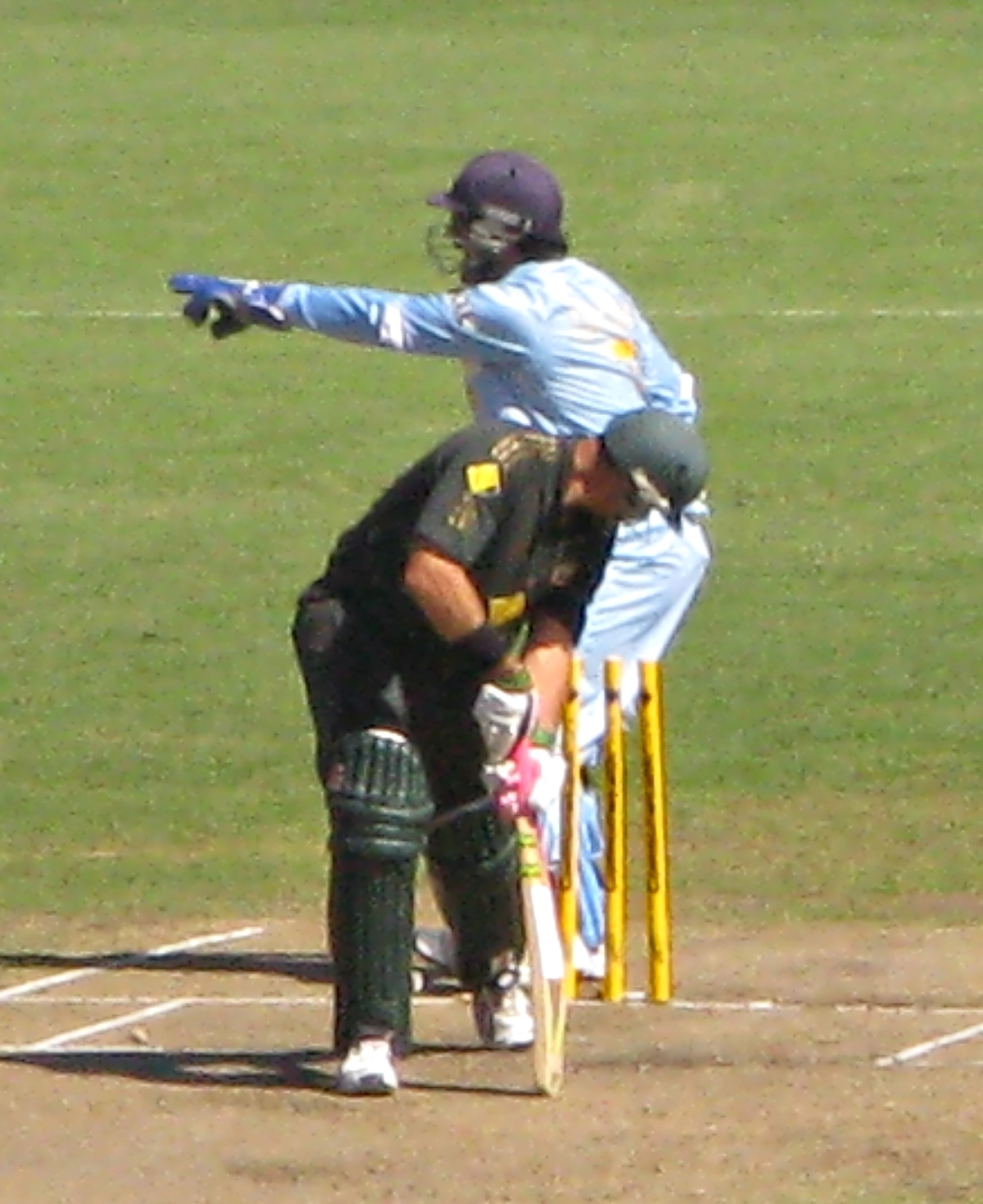
Indian wicketkeeper-captain MS Dhoni appeals for a stumping against Matthew Hayden.
