= Shibpur Assembly constituency =

Shibpur
- Constituency No. 172 for the West Bengal Legislative Assembly
- Interactive Map Outlining Shibpur Assembly Constituency

Constituency details
- Country: India
- Region: East India
- State: West Bengal
- District: Howrah
- Lok Sabha constituency: Howrah
- Established: 1967
- Total electors: 197,161
- Reservation: None

Member of Legislative Assembly
- 18th West Bengal Legislative Assembly
- Incumbent Rudranil Ghosh
- Party: BJP
- Alliance: NDA
- Elected year: 2026
- Preceded by: Rana Chatterjee

Shibpur Assembly constituency is an assembly constituency in Howrah district in the Indian state of West Bengal.

== Overview ==
As per orders of the Delimitation Commission, No. 172 Shibpur Assembly constituency is composed of the following: Ward Nos. 9 to 15, 29 to 34 and 43 Howrah Municipal Corporation.

Ward No.	Councillor	Party
9	Vacant	Vacant
10	Vacant	Vacant
11	Vacant	Vacant
12	Vacant	Vacant
13	Vacant	Vacant
14	Vacant	Vacant
15	Vacant	Vacant
29	Vacant	Vacant
30	Vacant	Vacant
31	Vacant	Vacant
32	Vacant	Vacant
33	Vacant	Vacant
34	Vacant	Vacant
43	Vacant	Vacant

Shibpur Assembly constituency is part of No. 25 Howrah Lok Sabha constituency.

== Members of the Legislative Assembly ==
Year	Name	Party
1967	Mrityunjoy Banerjee	Indian National Congress
1971	Hari Sadhan Mitra	Communist Party of India (Marxist)
1972	Mrigendra Mukherjee	Indian National Congress
1977	Kanailal Bhattacharyya	All India Forward Bloc
1982	Kanailal Bhattacharyya	All India Forward Bloc
1987	Satyendra Nath Ghose	All India Forward Bloc
1991	Jatu Lahiri	Indian National Congress
1996	Jatu Lahiri	Indian National Congress
2001	Jatu Lahiri	Trinamool Congress
2006	Jagannath Bhattacharya	All India Forward Bloc
2011	Jatu Lahiri	Trinamool Congress
2016	Jatu Lahiri	Trinamool Congress
2021	Manoj Tiwary	Trinamool Congress
2026	Rudranil Ghosh	Bharatiya Janata Party

== Election results ==
=== 2026 ===
2026 West Bengal Legislative Assembly election: Shibpur
Party	Candidate	Votes	%	±%
BJP	Rudranil Ghosh	89,615	49.42	▲16.62
AITC	Rana Chatterjee	73,557	40.57	▼10.12
AIFB	Jagannath Bhattacharya	12,542	6.92	▼6.78
INC	Shrabanti Singh	1,993	1.1	
NOTA	None of the above	1,300	0.72	▼0.33
Majority		16,058	8.85	▼9.04
Turnout		181,323	92.94	▲14.96
BJP gain from AITC		Swing	13.37%	

=== 2021 ===
2021 West Bengal Legislative Assembly election: Shibpur
Party	Candidate	Votes	%	±%
AITC	Manoj Tiwary	92,372	50.69	
BJP	Rathin Chakrabarty	59,769	32.8	
AIFB	Jagannath Bhattacharyya	24,970	13.7	
NOTA	None of the above	1,912	1.05	
Majority		32,603	17.89	
Turnout		182,219	77.98	
AITC hold		Swing		

=== 2011 ===
2011 West Bengal Legislative Assembly election: Shibpur
Party	Candidate	Votes	%	±%
AITC	Jatu Lahiri	100,739	61.83	
AIFB	Jagannath Bhattacharyya	54,335	33.35	
BJP	Prabir Ray	3,967	2.43	
BSP	Ali Asgar	1,850	1.14	
Independent	Bidyut Rakshit	1,119	0.69	
Independent	Anup Chowdhury	913	0.56	
Majority		46,404	28.48	
Turnout		162,923	82.29	
Swing to AITC from AIFB		Swing		

=== 2006 ===
2006 West Bengal Legislative Assembly election: Shibpur
Party	Candidate	Votes	%	±%
AIFB	Dr. Jagannath Bhattacharyya	92,894	46.39	
AITC	Jatu Lahiri	83,335	41.62	
INC	Binodananda Banerjee (Bintu)	18,573	9.28	
Independent	Swapan Ruidas	2,051	1.02	
Independent	Soumitra Sengupta	1,758	0.88	
Independent	Uttam Dolui	708	0.35	
Independent	Dharampal Singh	526	0.26	
Independent	Das Swapan	392	0.20	
Majority		9,559	4.77	
Turnout				
Swing to AIFB from AITC		Swing		

=== 2001 ===
2001 West Bengal Legislative Assembly election: Shibpur
Party	Candidate	Votes	%	±%
AITC	Jatu Lahiri	105,921	51.05	
AIFB	Nepal Kanti Bhattacharjee	92,703	44.68	
BJP	Prabir Roy	4,999	2.41	
Independent	Swapan Ruidas	1,471	0.71	
PDS	Subrata Paul	793	0.38	
Independent	Jiten Kumar Paul	695	0.33	
Independent	Uttam Dalui	363	0.17	
Independent	Sankar Dhara	293	0.14	
Independent	Uday Bar	232	0.11	
Majority		13,218	6.37	
Turnout		207,512	70.98	
Swing to AITC from INC		Swing		

=== 1996 ===
1996 West Bengal Legislative Assembly election: Shibpur
Party	Candidate	Votes	%	±%
INC	Jatu Lahiri	102,985	50.62	
AIFB	Prabir Kumar Banerjee	88,111	43.31	
BJP	Lakshmi Narayan Mullick	10,693	5.26	
Independent	Bipin Pande	756	0.37	
Independent	Subrata Paul	480	0.24	
Independent	Shingh Parmeshwar Prasad	416	0.20	
Majority		14,874	7.31	
Turnout		208,987	76.31	
INC hold		Swing		

=== 1991 ===
1991 West Bengal Legislative Assembly election: Shibpur
Party	Candidate	Votes	%	±%
INC	Jatu Lahiri	76,246	45.72	
AIFB	Satyendra Nath Ghose	72,138	43.25	
BJP	Mani Bhusan Chakraborty	16,516	9.90	
Independent	Subrata Paul	490	0.29	
WPI	Mukti Kumar Sidhanta	449	0.27	
Independent	Bimal Sarkhel	444	0.27	
Independent	Raj Deo Choudhury	264	0.16	
Independent	Anath Bandhu Bhowmick	234	0.14	
Majority		4,108	2.46	
Turnout		170,477	69.54	
Swing to INC from AIFB		Swing		

=== 1987 ===
1987 West Bengal Legislative Assembly election: Shibpur
Party	Candidate	Votes	%	±%
AIFB	Satyendra Nath Ghose	69,507	51.53	
INC	Mrigen Mukherjee	62,542	46.37	
Independent	Ardhendu Hazra	957	0.71	
Independent	Binoy Guha Mozumder	518	0.38	
Independent	Prabir Paul	355	0.26	
Independent	Bhabshilpi Gopal Dey	314	0.23	
Independent	Dharmalal Singh	275	0.20	
Independent	Somen Chowdhury	270	0.20	
Independent	Gouri Shankar Ganguly	142	0.11	
Majority		6,965	5.16	
Turnout		136,909	73.48	
AIFB hold		Swing		

=== 1982 ===
1982 West Bengal Legislative Assembly election: Shibpur
Party	Candidate	Votes	%	±%
AIFB	Kanailal Bhattacharya	61,381	58.01	
INC	Utpal Bhowmick	41,435	39.16	
JP	Birendra Kumar Chatterjee	2,108	1.99	
Independent	Jibandhan Mukerji	498	0.47	
Independent	Bhab Silpi Gopal Dey	382	0.36	
Majority		19,946	18.85	
Turnout		108,304	71.08	
AIFB hold		Swing		

=== 1977 ===
1977 West Bengal Legislative Assembly election: Shibpur
Party	Candidate	Votes	%	±%
AIFB	Kanai Lal Bhattacharyya	41,850	61.81	
INC	Mrigendra Mukherjee	14,856	21.94	
JP	Binodananda Banerjee	10,539	15.57	
Independent	Janarlal Roy	224	0.33	
Independent	Jibandhan Mukhopadhya	133	0.20	
Independent	Ajoy Chowdhyry	105	0.16	
Majority		26,994	39.87	
Turnout		68,879	54.83	
Swing to AIFB from INC		Swing		

=== 1972 ===
1972 West Bengal Legislative Assembly election: Shibpur
Party	Candidate	Votes	%	±%
INC	Mrigendra Mukherjee	31,109	54.71	
AIFB	Kanai Lal Bhattacharya	24,941	43.87	
INC(O)	Sailen Parbat	808	1.42	
Majority		6,168	10.84	
Turnout		58,483	63.26	
Swing to INC from CPI(M)		Swing		

=== 1971 ===
1971 West Bengal Legislative Assembly election: Shibpur
Party	Candidate	Votes	%	±%
CPI(M)	Harisadhan Mitra	17,240	39.11	
AIFB	Kanai Lal Bhattacharya	13,491	30.61	
INC	Asoke Kumar Mullack	9,704	22.02	
INC(O)	Ashis Roy	3,052	6.92	
Bangla Congress	Minati Adhikary	591	1.34	
Majority		3,749	8.50	
Turnout		46,868	52.85	
Swing to CPI(M) from INC		Swing		

=== 1967 ===
1967 West Bengal Legislative Assembly election: Shibpur
Party	Candidate	Votes	%	±%
INC	M. Banerjee	19,617	37.45	
AIFB	K. Bhattacharya	18,312	34.96	
CPI(M)	H. Mitra	14,446	27.58	
Majority		1,305	2.49	
Turnout		55,016	69.76	
INC win (new seat)				
