= Howrah Uttar Assembly constituency =

Howrah Uttar
- Constituency No. 170 for the West Bengal Legislative Assembly
- Interactive Map Outlining Howrah Uttar Assembly Constituency

Constituency details
- Country: India
- Region: East India
- State: West Bengal
- District: Howrah
- Lok Sabha constituency: Howrah
- Established: 1951
- Total electors: 171,318
- Reservation: None

Member of Legislative Assembly
- 18th West Bengal Legislative Assembly
- Incumbent Umesh Rai
- Party: BJP
- Alliance: NDA
- Elected year: 2026

Howrah Uttar Assembly constituency is an assembly constituency in Howrah district in the Indian state of West Bengal.

== Overview ==
As per orders of the Delimitation Commission, No. 170 Howrah Uttar Assembly constituency is composed of the following: Ward Nos. 1 to 8 and 16 to 24 of Howrah Municipal Corporation.

Ward No.	Councillor	Party
1	Vacant	Vacant
2	Vacant	Vacant
3	Vacant	Vacant
4	Vacant	Vacant
5	Vacant	Vacant
6	Vacant	Vacant
7	Vacant	Vacant
8	Vacant	Vacant
16	Vacant	Vacant
17	Vacant	Vacant
18	Vacant	Vacant
19	Vacant	Vacant
20	Vacant	Vacant
21	Vacant	Vacant
22	Vacant	Vacant
23	Vacant	Vacant
24	Vacant	Vacant

Howrah Uttar Assembly constituency is part of No. 25 Howrah Lok Sabha constituency.

== Members of the Legislative Assembly ==
Year	Name	Party
Howrah North
1951	Biren Banerjee	Communist Party of India
1957	Samar Mukhopadhyay	Communist Party of India
1962	Saila Kumar Mukherjee	Indian National Congress
1967	Saila Kumar Mukherjee	Indian National Congress
1969	Nirmal Kumar Mukherjee	Indian National Congress
1971	Shankar Lal Mukherjee	Indian National Congress
1972	Shankar Lal Mukherjee	Indian National Congress
1977	Chittabrata Majumdar	Communist Party of India (Marxist)
1982	Ashok Ghosh	Indian National Congress
1987	Ashok Ghosh	Indian National Congress
1991	Lagan Deo Singh	Communist Party of India (Marxist)
1996	Lagan Deo Singh	Communist Party of India (Marxist)
2001	Lagan Deo Singh	Communist Party of India (Marxist)
2006	Lagan Deo Singh	Communist Party of India (Marxist)
Constituency renamed as Howrah Uttar from 2011
2011	Ashok Ghosh	Trinamool Congress
2016	Laxmi Ratan Shukla	Trinamool Congress
2021	Gautam Chowdhuri	Trinamool Congress
2026	Umesh Rai	Bharatiya Janata Party

== Election results ==
=== 2026 ===
2026 West Bengal Legislative Assembly election: Howrah Uttar
Party	Candidate	Votes	%	±%
BJP	Umesh Rai	67,539	50.76	▲6.64
AITC	Gautam Chowdhuri	56,289	42.3	▼5.51
CPI(M)	Gautam Roy	5,997	4.51	▼0.92
NOTA	None of the above	848	0.64	▼0.48
Majority		11,250	8.46	▲4.77
Turnout		133,063	88.64	▲20.13
BJP gain from AITC		Swing	▲12.15	

=== 2021 ===
2021 West Bengal Legislative Assembly election: Howrah Uttar
Party	Candidate	Votes	%	±%
AITC	Gautam Chowdhuri	71,575	47.81	▲1.41
BJP	Umesh Rai	66,053	44.12	▲20.62
CPI(M)	Pawan Singh	8,133	5.43	
NOTA	None of the above	1,670	1.12	▲0.33
Majority		5,522	3.69	▼16.33
Turnout		149,720	68.51	▲0.53
AITC hold		Swing	▲1.41	

=== 2016 ===
2016 West Bengal Legislative Assembly election: Howrah Uttar
Party	Candidate	Votes	%	±%
AITC	Laxmi Ratan Shukla	61,917	46.4	▼2.85
INC	Santosh Kumar Pathak	34,958	26.2	
BJP	Roopa Ganguly	31,416	23.5	▲12.28
IND	Subodh Pathak	1,146	0.9	
NOTA	None of the above	1,070	0.79	
Majority		26,959	20.02	▲4.31
Turnout		1,34,764	67.98	▼4.54
AITC hold		Swing	▼2.85	

=== 2011 ===
2011 West Bengal Legislative Assembly election: Howrah Uttar
Party	Candidate	Votes	%	±%
AITC	Ashok Ghosh	61,468	49.25	▲7.29
CPI(M)	Nemai Samanta	41,858	33.54	▼20.46
BJP	Umesh Rai	16,494	13.22	
IND	Hitendranath Mondal	1,514	1.21	
BSP	Siddhartha Sarkar	761	0.61	
Majority		19,610	15.71	
Turnout		1,24,865	72.52	
AITC gain from CPI(M)		Swing	▲27.75	

=== 2006 ===
In the 2006, 2001, 1996 and 1991 state assembly elections Lagan Deo Singh of CPI(M) won the Howrah North assembly seat defeating his nearest rivals Bani Singha of Trinamool Congress in 2006, Asok Ghosh of Congress in the three other years. Contests in most years were multi cornered but only winners and runners are being mentioned. Asok Ghosh of Congress defeated Lagan Deo Singh of CPI(M) in 1987 and Chittabrata Majumdar of CPI(M) in 1982. Chittabrata Mazumdar of CPI(M) defeated Supriya Basu of Congress in 1977.

=== 1972 ===
Shankarlal Mukherjee of Congress won in 1972 and 1971. Nirmal Kumar Mukherjee of Congress won in 1969. S. K. Mukherjee of Congress won in 1967.

=== 1962 ===
During the period Howrah had four Vidhan Sabha constituencies.

==== Howrah North ====
Saila Mukherjee of Congress won in 1962. Samar Mukhopadhyay of CPI won in 1957. Biren Banerjee of CPI won in 1951.

==== Howrah West ====
Anadi Dass, Independent, won in 1962. Bankim Chandra Kar of Congress won in 1957 and 1951.

==== Howrah East ====
Bejoy Bhattacharyya of Congress won in 1962. Beni Charan Dutta of Congress won in 1957. Saila Kumar Mukhopdhyay of Congress won in 1951.
