= Brajamohan Mazumder =

Indian politician

Brajamohan Mazumder (born 1940) is an Indian politician from West Bengal. He is a former member of the West Bengal Legislative Assembly from Howrah Dakshin Assembly constituency in Howrah district. He won the 2016 West Bengal Legislative Assembly election representing the All India Trinamool Congress.

== Early life and education ==
Mazumder is from Howrah, West Bengal. He is the son of late Asutosh Majumder. He completed his MA at University of Calcutta in 1962 and later, did his BT also at University of Calcutta in 1967. He is a retired headmaster of Howrah Vivekananda Institution and a National teacher award winner.

== Career ==
Mazumder made his electoral debut at 72 years after over 40 years as a school teacher and was elected as an MLA for the first time in the 2011 West Bengal Legislative Assembly election from Howrah Dakshin Assembly constituency representing the All India Trinamool Congress. He polled 101,066 votes and defeated his nearest rival, Krishna Kishor Roy of the Communist Party of India (Marxist), by a margin of 31,422 votes. He retained the seat for the Trinamool Congress winning the 2016 West Bengal Legislative Assembly election. In 2016, he polled 93,689 votes and defeated his nearest rival, Arindam Basu of the Communist Party of india (Marxist), by a margin of 16,194 votes.
