= Mrityunjoy Banerjee (economist) =

Indian politician and economist (born 1920)

Mrityunjoy Banerjee

Mrityunjoy Banerjee (born 1 October 1920) was an Indian politician and economist. A prolific writer, Banerjee served three terms in the West Bengal Legislative Assembly and was the Minister of Education in the state government from 1972 to 1977.

== Life and career ==
Mrityunjoy Banerjee was born on 1 October 1920, in Barijhati (Hooghly District). He was the son of Prasanna Kumar Banerjee.

Banerjee studied at the Indian Institute of Social Welfare and Business Management. He obtained a M.A. (Economics) degree from University of Calcutta in 1942, and a LL.B. degree from the University Law College in Calcutta in 1950. He was the private secretary of the West Bengal Finance Minister Nalini Ranjan Sarkar from 1948 to 1952.

He worked as a lecturer at the Commerce Department at the University of Calcutta, and as a journalist. He served as secretary and president of the Rotary Club of Howrah. He was a renowned economist and authored several books, such as The Constitution of Free India (1947) and Economic Planning for India (1947). He was a fellow of the Royal Economic Society in London, secretary of the Indian Council of Economic Affairs in Calcutta and the general secretary of the Indo-Japanese Association in Calcutta. He studied at the Graduate School of Business of the University of Pittsburgh, and obtained a M.B.A. degree from there in 1959.

Banerjee was a member of the Indian National Congress, and served as vice president of the West Bengal Pradesh Congress Committee. He was elected to the West Bengal Legislative Assembly in the 1967 election, standing as the Congress candidate in the Shibpur constituency. Banerjee obtained 19,617 votes (37.45%). In the subsequent 1969 West Bengal Legislative Assembly election, Banerjee contested the Panchla seat, finishing in second place with 2nd 19,601 votes (32.99%). He won the Howrah Central seat in the 1972 West Bengal Legislative Assembly election, receiving 25,326 votes (60.28%).

He served as the Minister-in-charge of the Department of Education (excluding Youth Services and Sports Branches) in the West Bengal state government 1972–1977. He lost the Howrah Central seat in the 1977 West Bengal Legislative Assembly election, finishing in third place with 10,717 votes (22.18%).

Banerjee returned to the West Bengal Legislative Assembly in the 1987 election, being elected from the Howrah South constituency with 41,139 votes (51.96%). He lost the Howrah South seat in the 1991 West Bengal Legislative Assembly election, finishing in second place with 33,381 votes (40.58%).
