= Jatu Lahiri =

Indian politician (1936–2023)

Member of West Bengal Legislative Assembly
- Constituency: Shibpur
- In office 1991–2006
- In office 2011–2016

Personal details
- Born: 28 April 1936
- Died: 16 February 2023 (aged 86) Shibpur, West Bengal, India
- Party: Bharatiya Janata Party; Trinamool Congress

Jatu Lahiri (Bengali: জটু লাহিড়ী; 28 April 1936 – 16 February 2023) was an Indian politician. He was an elected member of the Legislative Assembly and MLA at Shibpur (Vidhan Sabha constituency) of the state of West Bengal in India.

Lahiri was also the chief advisor of the "Santragachi Co-operative Bank".

Lahiri died on 16 February 2023, at the age of 86.
