= Gautam Chowdhuri =

Indian politician

Gautam Chowdhuri (born 1973) is an Indian politician from West Bengal. He is a member of the West Bengal Legislative Assembly from Howrah Uttar Assembly constituency in Howrah district. He won the 2021 West Bengal Legislative Assembly election representing the All India Trinamool Congress.

== Early life and education ==
Chowdhuri is from Howrah, West Bengal. He is the son of late Narayan Chowdhuri. He passed Class 12 in 1993 from Bihar School Examination Board, Patna.

== Career ==
Chowdhuri won from Howrah Uttar Assembly constituency representing Trinamool Congress in the 2021 West Bengal Legislative Assembly election. He polled 71,575 votes and defeated his nearest rival, Umesh Rai of the Bharatiya Janata Party, by a margin of 5,522 votes.
