= 2024 Indian general election in West Bengal =

2024 Indian general political election in West Bengal state

- 19 April 2024 to 1 June 2024

All 42 West Bengal seats in the Lok Sabha
- Registered: 76,010,006
- Turnout: 60,483,687 (79.59%) ▼2.17% pp

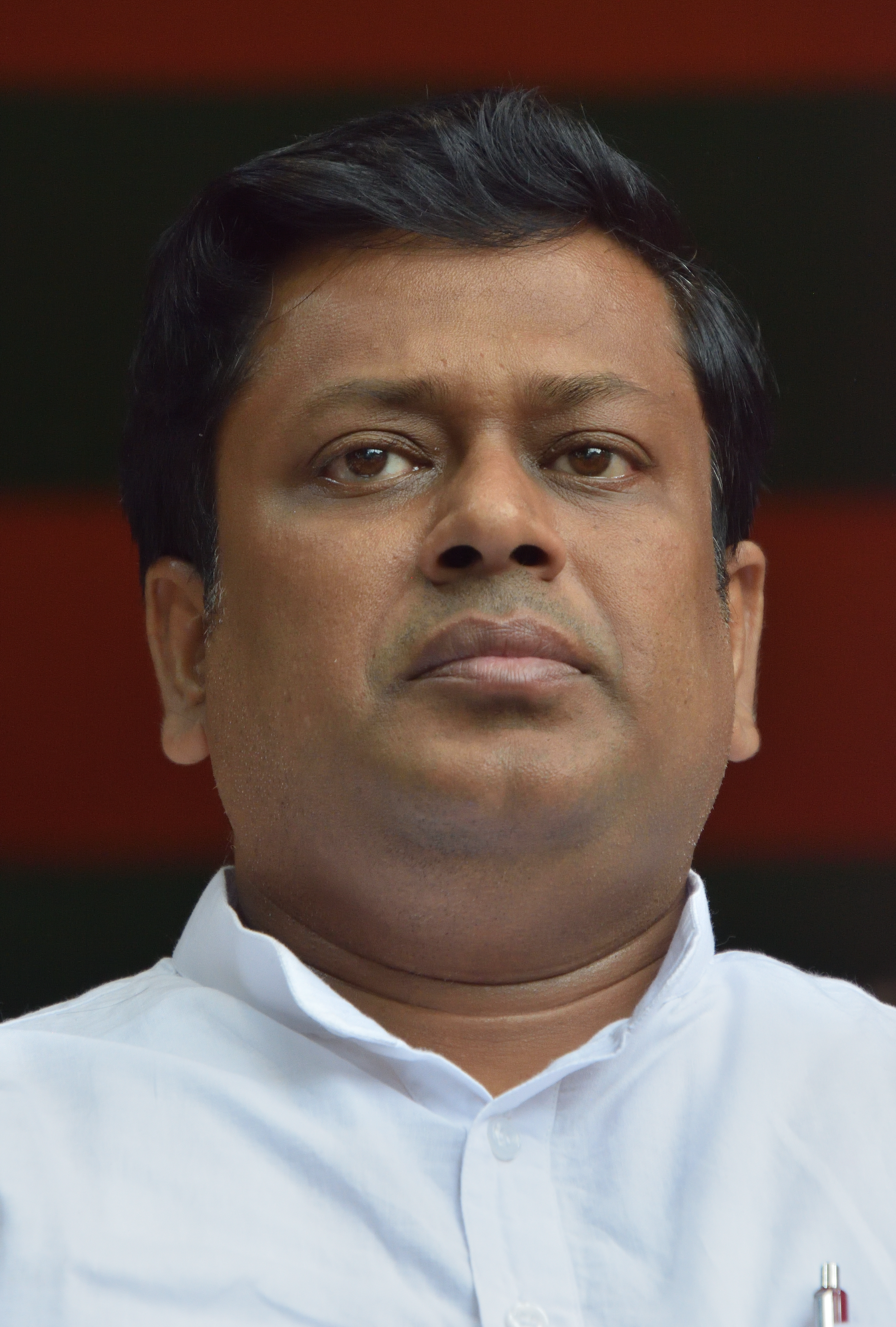

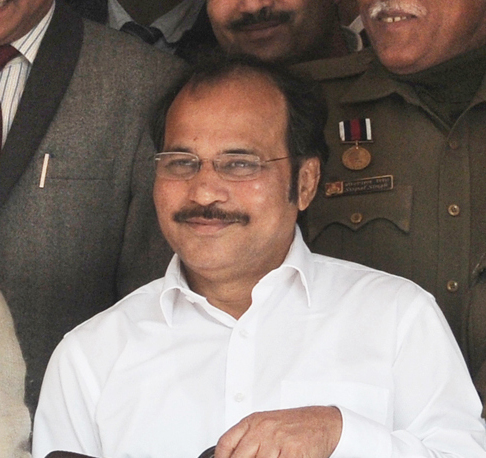
	First party	Second party	Third party
Leader	Mamata Banerjee	Sukanta Majumdar	Adhir Ranjan Chowdhury
Party	AITC	BJP	INC
Alliance	TMC+	NDA	INDIA
Leader since	2014	2021	2020
Leader's seat	Did not contest	Balurghat (won)	Baharampur (lost)
Last election	43.69%, 22 seats	40.64%, 18 seats	5.67%, 2 seats
Seats won	29	12	1
Seat change	▲7	▼6	▼1
Popular vote	27,674,133	23,431,081	2,818,728
Percentage	46.16%	39.08%	4.72%
Swing	▲2.47 pp	▼1.56 pp	▼0.95 pp
Leads in assembly segments	192 (Note: ▲32 as compared to the leads in assembly segments in 2019. ▼23 as compared to the results of the 2021 state election.)	90 (Note: ▼31 as compared to the leads in assembly segments in 2019. ▲13 as compared to the results of the 2021 state election.)	11 (Note: ▲2 as compared to the leads in assembly segments in 2019. ▲11 as compared to the results in the 2021 state election.)
Prime Minister before election
Narendra Modi
BJP
Prime Minister after election
Narendra Modi
BJP

The 2024 Indian general election was held in West Bengal in seven phases between 19 April and 1 June 2024 to elect 42 members of the 18th Lok Sabha. The result of the election was announced on 4 June 2024.

The by-elections for Bhagabangola and Baranagar in the West Bengal Legislative Assembly was also scheduled with the general election and took place on 7 May and 1 June respectively.

West Bengal, along with Uttar Pradesh and Bihar, were the only states where the 2024 Indian general election was held in all 7 phases.

== Election schedule ==
Phase wise schedule of 2024 Indian general election in West Bengal

On 16 March 2024, the Election Commission of India announced the schedule of the 2024 Indian general election, with West Bengal scheduled to vote during all the 7 phases starting from 19 April and concluding on 1 June.

Poll event	Phase						
Poll event	I	II	III	IV	V	VI	VII
Notification date	20 March	28 March	12 April	18 April	26 April	29 April	7 May
Last date for filing nomination	27 March	4 April	19 April	25 April	3 May	6 May	14 May
Scrutiny of nomination	28 March	5 April	20 April	26 April	4 May	7 May	15 May
Last Date for withdrawal of nomination	30 March	8 April	22 April	29 April	6 May	9 May	17 May
Date of poll	19 April	26 April	7 May	13 May	20 May	25 May	1 June
Date of counting of votes/Result	4 June 2024						
No. of constituencies	3	3	4	8	7	8	9

== Parties and alliances ==
=== All India Trinamool Congress ===
All India Trinamool Congress

Party	Flag	Symbol	Leader	Seats contested
All India Trinamool Congress			Mamata Banerjee	42

=== Bharatiya Janata Party ===
Bharatiya Janata Party

Party	Flag	Symbol	Leader	Seats contested
Bharatiya Janata Party			Sukanta Majumdar	42

=== Secular Democratic Alliance ===
Secular Democratic Alliance

Seat-sharing of Secular Democratic Alliance (SDA) in West Bengal

Party	Flag	Symbol	Leader	Seats contested
Communist Party of India (Marxist)			Mohammed Salim	23
Indian National Congress			Adhir Ranjan Chowdhury	12 (Note: INC is contesting 12 seats under the alliance and 1 seat (Cooch Behar) independently.)
Revolutionary Socialist Party			Tapan Hor	3
Communist Party of India			Swapan Banerjee	2
All India Forward Bloc			Naren Chatterjee	2 (Note: AIFB is contesting 2 seats under the alliance and 1 seat (Purulia) independently.)
Total				42 (Note: INC is contesting one (Cooch Behar) Lok Sabha constituency and AIFB is contesting one (Purulia) Lok Sabha constituency independently outside of alliance.)

=== Others ===
Party	Flag	Symbol	Leader	Seats contested
Socialist Unity Centre of India (Communist)			Provash Ghosh	42
All India Secular Front			Nawsad Siddique	17
Bahujan Samaj Party			Manoj Hawladar	5
All India Majlis-e-Ittehadul Muslimeen			-	4
Communist Party of India (Marxist–Leninist) Liberation			Dipankar Bhattacharya	1

== Candidates ==
Constituency		AITC		BJP		SDA	
#	Name	Party	Candidate	Party	Candidate	Party	Candidate
1	Cooch Behar (SC)	AITC	Jagadish Chandra Basunia	BJP	Nisith Pramanik	AIFB	Nitish Chandra Roy (Note: INC's Piya Roy Chowdhury is also contesting the seat independently outside of alliance.)
2	Alipurduars (ST)	AITC	Prakash Chik Baraik	BJP	Manoj Tigga	RSP	Mili Oraon
3	Jalpaiguri (SC)	AITC	Nirmal Chandra Roy	BJP	Jayanta Kumar Roy	CPM	Debraj Barman
4	Darjeeling	AITC	Gopal Lama	BJP	Raju Bista	INC	Munish Tamang
5	Raiganj	AITC	Krishna Kalyani	BJP	Kartick Chandra Paul	INC	Ali Imran Ramz
6	Balurghat	AITC	Biplab Mitra	BJP	Sukanta Majumdar	RSP	Jaydeb Siddhanta
7	Maldaha Uttar	AITC	Prasun Banerjee	BJP	Khagen Murmu	INC	Mostaque Alam
8	Maldaha Dakshin	AITC	Shahnawaz Ali Raihan	BJP	Sreerupa Mitra Chaudhury	INC	Isha Khan Choudhury
9	Jangipur	AITC	Khalilur Rahaman	BJP	Dhananjay Ghosh	INC	Mortaza Hossain Bokul
10	Baharampur	AITC	Yusuf Pathan	BJP	Nirmal Kumar Saha	INC	Adhir Ranjan Chowdhury
11	Murshidabad	AITC	Abu Taher Khan	BJP	Gouri Shankar Ghosh	CPM	Mohammed Salim
12	Krishnanagar	AITC	Mahua Moitra	BJP	Amrita Roy	CPM	S. M. Saadi
13	Ranaghat (SC)	AITC	Mukut Mani Adhikari	BJP	Jagannath Sarkar	CPM	Alokesh Das
14	Bongaon (SC)	AITC	Biswajit Das	BJP	Shantanu Thakur	INC	Pradip Biswas
15	Barrackpore	AITC	Partha Bhowmick	BJP	Arjun Singh	CPM	Debdut Ghosh
16	Dum Dum	AITC	Saugata Roy	BJP	Shilbhadra Dutta	CPM	Sujan Chakraborty
17	Barasat	AITC	Kakoli Ghosh Dastidar	BJP	Swapan Majumder	AIFB	Sanjib Chatterjee
18	Basirhat	AITC	Haji Nurul Islam	BJP	Rekha Patra	CPM	Nirapada Sardar
19	Jaynagar (SC)	AITC	Pratima Mondal	BJP	Ashok Kandari	RSP	Samarendra Nath Mandal
20	Mathurapur (SC)	AITC	Bapi Halder	BJP	Ashok Purkait	CPM	Sarat Chandra Haldar
21	Diamond Harbour	AITC	Abhishek Banerjee	BJP	Abhijit Das	CPM	Pratikur Rahaman
22	Jadavpur	AITC	Saayoni Ghosh	BJP	Anirban Ganguly	CPM	Srijan Bhattacharyya
23	Kolkata Dakshin	AITC	Mala Roy	BJP	Debasree Chaudhuri	CPM	Saira Shah Halim
24	Kolkata Uttar	AITC	Sudip Bandyopadhyay	BJP	Tapas Roy	INC	Pradip Bhattacharya
25	Howrah	AITC	Prasun Banerjee	BJP	Rathin Chakraborty	CPM	Sabyasachi Chatterjee
26	Uluberia	AITC	Sajda Ahmed	BJP	Arun Uday Paul Chowdhury	INC	Azahar Mallick
27	Sreerampur	AITC	Kalyan Banerjee	BJP	Kabir Shankar Bose	CPM	Dipsita Dhar
28	Hooghly	AITC	Rachna Banerjee	BJP	Locket Chatterjee	CPM	Monodip Ghosh
29	Arambagh (SC)	AITC	Mitali Bag	BJP	Arup Kanti Digar	CPM	Biplab Kumar Moitra
30	Tamluk	AITC	Debangshu Bhattacharya	BJP	Abhijit Gangopadhyay	CPM	Sayan Banerjee
31	Kanthi	AITC	Uttam Barik	BJP	Soumendu Adhikari	INC	Urbashi Bhattacharya
32	Ghatal	AITC	Deepak Adhikari (Dev)	BJP	Hiran Chatterjee	CPI	Tapan Ganguly
33	Jhargram (ST)	AITC	Kalipada Soren	BJP	Pranat Tudu	CPM	Sonamoni Tudu
34	Medinipur	AITC	June Malia	BJP	Agnimitra Paul	CPI	Biplab Bhatta
35	Purulia	AITC	Santiram Mahato	BJP	Jyotirmay Singh Mahato	INC	Nepal Mahato (Note: AIFB's Dhirendra Nath Mahato is also contesting the seat independently outside of alliance.)
36	Bankura	AITC	Arup Chakraborty	BJP	Subhash Sarkar	CPM	Nilanjan Dasgupta
37	Bishnupur (SC)	AITC	Sujata Mondal	BJP	Saumitra Khan	CPM	Shital Kaibartya
38	Bardhaman Purba (SC)	AITC	Sharmila Sarkar	BJP	Ashim Kumar Sarkar	CPM	Nirav Kha
39	Bardhaman–Durgapur	AITC	Kirti Azad	BJP	Dilip Ghosh	CPM	Sukriti Ghosal
40	Asansol	AITC	Shatrughan Sinha	BJP	S. S. Ahluwalia	CPM	Jahanara Khan
41	Bolpur (SC)	AITC	Asit Kumar Mal	BJP	Piya Saha	CPM	Shyamali Pradhan
42	Birbhum	AITC	Satabdi Roy	BJP	Debtanu Bhattacharya	INC	Milton Rashid

== Surveys and polls ==
=== Opinion polls ===
Polling agency	Date published	Margin of error					Lead
Polling agency	Date published	Margin of error	AITC	NDA	SDA	Others	Lead
News18	March 2024	±4%	17	25	0	0	NDA
ABP News-CVoter	March 2024	±5%	23	19	0	0	AITC
India TV-CNX	March 2024	±3%	21	20	1	0	AITC
Zee News-Matrize	February 2024	±2%	24	17	1	0	AITC
India Today-CVoter	February 2024	±3-5%	22	19	1	0	AITC
Times Now-ETG	February 2024	±2%	26	15	1	0	AITC
ABP News-CVoter	December 2023	±3-5%	23-25	16-18	0-2	0	AITC
Times Now-ETG	December 2023	±3%	20-24	18-20	2-4	0	AITC
India TV-CNX	October 2023	±3%	30	10	2	0	AITC
Times Now-ETG	August 2023	±3%	22-24	16-18	0-3	0	AITC

Polling agency	Date published	Margin of error					Lead
Polling agency	Date published	Margin of error	AITC	NDA	SDA	Others	Lead
ABP News-CVoter	March 2024	±5%	42.5%	40.9%	17.6%		1.6

=== Exit polls ===
Polling agency					Lead
Polling agency	NDA	AITC	LF+INC	Others	Lead
ABP News-CVoter	23-27	13-17	1-3	0	NDA
DB Live	11-12	26-28	2-4	0	AITC
India Today- Axis My India	26-31	11-14	0-2	0	NDA
India News-Dynamics	21	19	2	0	NDA
India TV-CNX	22-26	14-18	1-2	0	NDA
NDTV-Jan Ki Baat	21-26	18-16	0-3	0	NDA
News 24-Today's Chanakya	24	17	1	0	NDA
News 18-CNBC	21-24	18-21	0	0	NDA
News Nation	19	22	1	0	AITC
Republic TV-Matrize	21-25	16-21	0	0	NDA
Republic TV-PMarq	22	20	0	0	NDA
Times Now-ETG	21	20	1	0	NDA
TV9 Bharatvarsh- People's Insight -Polstrat	21	20	1	0	NDA
2019 election	18	22	2	0	AITC
Actual results	12	29	1	0	AITC

== Voter turnout ==
=== Phase wise ===
Phase	Poll date	Constituencies	Voter turnout (%)
I	19 April 2024	Cooch Behar, Alipurduars, Jalpaiguri	81.91%
II	26 April 2024	Darjeeling, Raiganj, Balurghat	76.58%
III	7 May 2024	Maldaha Uttar, Maldaha Dakshin, Jangipur, Murshidabad	77.53%
IV	13 May 2024	Baharampur, Krishnanagar, Ranaghat, Bardhaman Purba, Bardhaman–Durgapur, Asansol, Bolpur, Birbhum	80.22%
V	20 May 2024	Bongaon, Barrackpore, Howrah, Uluberia, Sreerampur, Hooghly, Arambagh	78.45%
VI	25 May 2024	Tamluk, Kanthi, Ghatal, Jhargram, Medinipur, Purulia, Bankura, Bishnupur	82.71%
VII	1 June 2024	Dum Dum, Barasat, Basirhat, Jaynagar, Mathurapur, Diamond Harbour, Jadavpur, Kolkata Dakshin, Kolkata Uttar	69.89%
Total			79.29%

=== Constituency wise ===
Constituency		Poll date	Turnout	Swing
1	Cooch Behar (SC)	19 April 2024	82.16%	▼1.92
2	Alipurduars (ST)	19 April 2024	79.76%	▼4.03
3	Jalpaiguri (SC)	19 April 2024	83.66%	▼2.85
4	Darjeeling	26 April 2024	74.76%	▼4.04
5	Raiganj	26 April 2024	76.18%	▼3.64
6	Balurghat	26 April 2024	79.09%	▼4.60
7	Maldaha Uttar	7 May 2024	76.03%	▼1.20
8	Maldaha Dakshin	7 May 2024	76.69%	▼4.55
9	Jangipur	7 May 2024	75.72%	▼5.00
10	Baharampur	13 May 2024	77.54%	▼1.87
11	Murshidabad	7 May 2024	81.52%	▼2.77
12	Krishnanagar	13 May 2024	80.65%	▼3.10
13	Ranaghat (SC)	13 May 2024	81.87%	▼2.39
14	Bangaon (SC)	20 May 2024	81.04%	▼1.60
15	Barrackpore	20 May 2024	75.41%	▼1.50
16	Dum Dum	1 June 2024	73.81%	▼2.79
17	Barasat	1 June 2024	80.17%	▼1.09
18	Basirhat	1 June 2024	84.31%	▼1.12
19	Jaynagar (SC)	1 June 2024	80.08%	▼2.21
20	Mathurapur (SC)	1 June 2024	82.02%	▼2.84
21	Diamond Harbour	1 June 2024	81.04%	▼0.94
22	Jadavpur	1 June 2024	76.68%	▼2.41
23	Kolkata Dakshin	1 June 2024	66.95%	▼2.87
24	Kolkata Uttar	1 June 2024	63.59%	▼2.16
25	Howrah	20 May 2024	71.73%	▼3.10
26	Uluberia	20 May 2024	79.78%	▼1.40
27	Sreerampur	20 May 2024	76.44%	▼2.10
28	Hooghly	20 May 2024	81.38%	▼1.14
29	Arambagh (SC)	20 May 2024	82.62%	▼0.82
30	Tamluk	25 May 2024	84.79%	▼0.59
31	Kanthi	25 May 2024	84.77%	▼0.52
32	Ghatal	25 May 2024	82.17%	▼0.23
33	Jhargram (ST)	25 May 2024	83.47%	▲1.95
34	Medinipur	25 May 2024	81.56%	▼2.44
35	Purulia	25 May 2024	78.39%	▼3.71
36	Bankura	25 May 2024	80.75%	▼2.22
37	Bishnupur (SC)	25 May 2024	85.91%	▼1.04
38	Bardhaman Purba (SC)	13 May 2024	82.85%	▼1.66
39	Bardhaman–Durgapur	13 May 2024	80.72%	▼1.56
40	Asansol	13 May 2024	73.27%	▼3.10
41	Bolpur (SC)	13 May 2024	82.66%	▼3.08
42	Birbhum	13 May 2024	81.91%	▼3.09

== Results ==
=== Results by party or alliance ===
29	12	1
AITC	BJP	INC

Vote Share (By alliance 2024 Lok Sabha West Bengal)
1. AITC (46.2%)
2. BJP (39.1%)
3. LF+INC (11.0%)
4. Others (3.61%)
5. NOTA (0.87%)

Alliance/ Party		Popular vote			Seats		
Alliance/ Party		Votes	%	±pp	Contested	Won	+/−
AITC		27,674,133	46.20	▲2.98	42	29	▲7
NDA	BJP	23,431,081	39.10	▼1.15	42	12	▼6
LF+INC	CPI(M)	3,432,981	5.70	▼0.58	23	0	Steady
LF+INC	INC	2,827,055	4.70	▼0.91	12	1	▼1
LF+INC	AIFB	144,839	0.20	▼0.21	2	0	Steady
LF+INC	RSP	134,039	0.20	▼0.19	3	0	Steady
LF+INC	CPI	132,693	0.20	▼0.16	2	0	Steady
LF+INC	Total	6,671,207	11.00	▼2.05	42	1	▼1
Others		2,176,281	2.80				
NOTA		530,985	0.90				
Total		60,483,687	100	-		42	-

=== Constituency wise party or alliance votes ===
Constituency						Win Margin
Constituency		INDIA			NDA	Win Margin
Constituency		AITC	SDA		BJP	Win Margin
Constituency		AITC	LF	INC	BJP	Win Margin
1	Cooch Behar (SC)	7,88,375	30,267	10,679	7,49,125	39,250
2	Alipurduars (ST)	6,19,867	27,427	—	6,95,314	75,447
3	Jalpaiguri (SC)	6,79,875	74,092	—	7,66,568	86,693
4	Darjeeling	5,00,806	—	83,374	6,79,331	1,78,525
5	Raiganj	4,92,700	—	2,63,273	5,60,897	68,197
6	Balurghat	5,64,610	54,217	—	5,74,996	10,386
7	Maldaha Uttar	4,49,315	—	3,84,764	5,27,023	77,708
8	Maldaha Dakshin	3,01,026	—	5,72,395	4,44,027	1,28,368
9	Jangipur	5,44,427	—	4,27,790	3,40,814	1,16,637
10	Baharampur	5,24,516	—	4,39,494	3,71,885	85,022
11	Murshidabad	6,82,442	5,18,227	—	2,92,031	1,64,215
12	Krishnanagar	6,28,789	1,80,201	—	5,72,084	56,705
13	Ranaghat (SC)	5,95,497	1,23,810	—	7,82,396	1,86,899
14	Bongaon (SC)	6,45,812	—	65,176	7,19,505	73,693
15	Barrackpore	5,20,231	1,09,564	—	4,55,793	64,438
16	Dum Dum	5,28,579	2,40,784	—	4,57,919	70,660
17	Barasat	6,92,010	1,00,000	—	5,77,821	1,14,189
18	Basirhat	8,03,762	77,899	—	4,70,215	3,33,547
19	Joynagar (SC)	8,94,312	40,113	—	4,24,093	4,70,219
20	Mathurapur (SC)	7,55,731	61,100	—	5,54,674	2,01,057
21	Diamond Harbour	10,48,230	86,953	—	3,37,300	7,10,930
22	Jadavpur	7,17,899	2,58,712	—	4,59,698	2,58,201
23	Kolkata Dakshin	6,15,274	1,68,531	—	4,28,043	1,87,231
24	Kolkata Uttar	4,54,696	—	1,14,982	3,62,136	92,560
25	Howrah	6,26,493	1,52,005	—	4,57,051	1,69,442
26	Uluberia	7,24,622	—	78,589	5,05,949	2,18,673
27	Sreerampur	6,73,970	2,39,146	—	4,99,140	1,74,830
28	Hooghly	7,02,744	1,39,919	—	6,25,891	76,853
29	Arambagh (SC)	7,12,587	92,502	—	7,06,188	6,399
30	Tamluk	6,87,851	85,389	—	7,65,584	77,733
31	Kanthi	7,15,431	—	31,122	7,63,195	47,764
32	Ghatal	8,37,990	74,908	—	6,55,122	1,82,868
33	Jhargram (ST)	7,43,478	77,302	—	5,69,430	1,74,048
34	Medinipur	7,02,192	57,785	—	6,75,001	27,191
35	Purulia	5,61,410	14,572	1,29,157	5,78,489	17,079
36	Bankura	6,41,813	1,05,359	—	6,09,035	32,778
37	Bishnupur (SC)	6,74,563	1,05,411	—	6,80,130	5,567
38	Bardhaman Purba (SC)	7,20,302	1,76,899	—	5,59,730	1,60,572
39	Bardhaman-Durgapur	7,20,667	1,53,829	—	5,82,686	1,37,981
40	Asansol	6,05,645	1,05,964	—	5,46,081	59,564
41	Bolpur (SC)	8,55,633	99,383	—	5,28,380	3,27,253
42	Birbhum	7,17,961	—	2,26,260	5,20,311	1,97,650

=== Results by constituency ===
Constituency			Winner				Runner Up				Margin	%
#	Name	Poll %	Candidate	Party	Votes	%	Candidate	Party	Votes	%	Margin	%
1	Cooch Behar (SC)	82.16%▼	Jagadish Basunia	AITC	7,88,375	48.57	Nisith Pramanik	BJP	7,49,125	46.16	39,250	2.41
2	Alipurduars (ST)	79.76%▼	Manoj Tigga	BJP	6,95,314	48.92	Prakash Chik Baraik	AITC	6,19,867	43.61	75,447	5.30
3	Jalpaiguri (SC)	83.66%▼	Jayanta Kumar Roy	BJP	7,66,568	48.57	Nirmal Chandra Roy	AITC	6,79,875	43.07	86,693	5.50
4	Darjeeling	74.76%▼	Raju Bista	BJP	6,79,331	51.18	Gopal Lama	AITC	5,00,806	37.73	1,78,525	13.45
5	Raiganj	76.18%▼	Kartick Chandra Paul	BJP	5,60,897	40.99	Krishna Kalyani	AITC	4,92,700	36.00	68,197	4.99
6	Balurghat	79.09%▼	Sukanta Majumder	BJP	5,74,996	46.47	Biplab Mitra	AITC	5,64,610	45.63	10,386	0.84
7	Maldaha Uttar	76.03%▼	Khagen Murmu	BJP	5,27,023	37.18	Prasun Banerjee	AITC	4,49,315	31.70	77,708	5.48
8	Maldaha Dakshin	76.69%▼	Isha Khan Choudhury	INC	5,72,395	41.79	Sreerupa Mitra Chaudhury	BJP	4,44,027	32.42	1,28,368	9.37
9	Jangipur	75.72%▼	Khalilur Rahaman	AITC	5,44,427	39.75	Murtaza Hossain	INC	4,27,790	31.23	1,16,637	8.52
10	Baharampur	77.54%▼	Yusuf Pathan	AITC	5,24,516	37.88	Adhir Ranjan Chowdhury	INC	4,39,494	31.74	85,022	6.14
11	Murshidabad	81.52%▼	Abu Taher Khan	AITC	6,82,442	44.27	Mohammed Salim	CPI(M)	5,18,227	33.62	1,64,215	10.65
12	Krishnanagar	80.65%▼	Mahua Moitra	AITC	6,28,789	44.10	Amrita Roy	BJP	5,72,084	40.13	56,705	3.98
13	Ranaghat (SC)	81.87%▼	Jagannath Sarkar	BJP	7,82,396	50.78	Mukut Mani Adhikari	AITC	5,95,497	38.65	1,86,899	12.13
14	Bongaon (SC)	81.04%▼	Shantanu Thakur	BJP	7,19,505	48.19	Biswajit Das	AITC	6,45,812	43.25	73,693	4.94
15	Barrackpore	75.41%▼	Partha Bhowmick	AITC	5,20,231	45.56	Arjun Singh	BJP	4,55,793	39.92	64,438	5.64
16	Dum Dum	73.81%▼	Saugata Roy	AITC	5,28,579	41.95	Shilbhadra Dutta	BJP	4,57,919	36.34	70,660	5.61
17	Barasat	80.17%▼	Kakoli Ghosh Dastidar	AITC	6,92,010	45.15	Swapan Majumder	BJP	5,77,821	37.70	1,14,189	7.45
18	Basirhat	84.31%▼	Haji Nurul Islam	AITC	8,03,762	52.76	Rekha Patra	BJP	4,70,215	30.87	3,33,547	21.89
19	Joynagar (SC)	80.08%▼	Pratima Mondal	AITC	8,94,312	60.32	Ashok Kandari	BJP	4,24,093	28.60	4,70,219	31.72
20	Mathurapur (SC)	82.02%▼	Bapi Halder	AITC	7,55,731	50.52	Ashok Purkait	BJP	5,54,674	37.08	2,01,057	13.44
21	Diamond Harbour	81.04%▼	Abhishek Banerjee	AITC	10,48,230	68.48	Abhijit Das	BJP	3,37,300	22.03	7,10,930	46.45
22	Jadavpur	76.68%▼	Saayoni Ghosh	AITC	7,17,899	45.83	Anirban Ganguly	BJP	4,59,698	29.35	2,58,201	16.48
23	Kolkata Dakshin	66.95%▼	Mala Roy	AITC	6,15,274	49.48	Debasree Chaudhuri	BJP	4,28,043	34.42	1,87,231	15.06
24	Kolkata Uttar	63.59%▼	Sudip Bandyopadhyay	AITC	4,54,696	47.44	Tapas Roy	BJP	3,62,136	37.78	92,560	9.62
25	Howrah	71.73%▼	Prasun Banerjee	AITC	6,26,493	49.26	Rathin Chakraborty	BJP	4,57,051	35.94	1,69,442	13.32
26	Uluberia	79.78%▼	Sajda Ahmed	AITC	7,24,622	52.10	Arun Uday Pal Chowdhury	BJP	5,05,949	36.38	2,18,673	15.72
27	Sreerampur	76.44%▼	Kalyan Banerjee	AITC	6,73,970	45.65	Kabir Shankar Bose	BJP	4,99,140	33.80	1,74,830	11.85
28	Hooghly	81.38%▼	Rachana Banerjee	AITC	7,02,744	46.31	Locket Chatterjee	BJP	6,25,891	41.24	76,853	5.07
29	Arambagh (SC)	82.62%▼	Mitali Bag	AITC	7,12,587	45.71	Arup Kanti Digar	BJP	7,06,188	45.30	6,399	0.41
30	Tamluk	84.79%▼	Abhijit Gangopadhyay	BJP	7,65,584	48.54	Debangshu Bhattacharya	AITC	6,87,851	43.61	77,733	4.93
31	Kanthi	84.77%▼	Soumendu Adhikari	BJP	7,63,195	49.85	Uttam Barik	AITC	7,15,431	46.73	47,764	3.12
32	Ghatal	82.17%▼	Deepak Adhikari	AITC	8,37,990	52.36	Hiran Chatterjee	BJP	6,55,122	40.93	1,82,868	11.43
33	Jhargram (ST)	83.47%▲	Kalipada Soren	AITC	7,43,478	49.87	Pranat Tudu	BJP	5,69,430	38.20	1,74,048	11.67
34	Medinipur	81.56%▼	June Malia	AITC	7,02,192	47.40	Agnimitra Paul	BJP	6,75,001	45.56	27,191	1.84
35	Purulia	78.39%▼	Jyotirmay Singh Mahato	BJP	5,78,489	40.34	Shantiram Mahato	AITC	5,61,410	39.15	17,079	1.19
36	Bankura	80.75%▼	Arup Chakraborty	AITC	6,41,813	44.33	Subhas Sarkar	BJP	6,09,035	42.07	32,778	2.26
37	Bishnupur (SC)	85.91%▼	Saumitra Khan	BJP	6,80,130	44.93	Sujata Mondal	AITC	6,74,563	44.56	5,567	0.37
38	Bardhaman Purba (SC)	82.85%▼	Sharmila Sarkar	AITC	7,30,302	48.11	Ashim Kumar Sarkar	BJP	5,59,730	37.38	1,60,572	10.72
39	Bardhaman–Durgapur	80.72%▼	Kirti Azad	AITC	7,20,667	47.99	Dilip Ghosh	BJP	5,82,686	38.80	1,37,981	9.19
40	Asansol	73.27%▼	Shatrughan Sinha	AITC	6,05,645	46.53	S. S. Ahluwalia	BJP	5,46,081	41.96	59,564	4.78
41	Bolpur (SC)	82.66%▼	Asit Kumar Mal	AITC	8,55,633	55.98	Piya Saha	BJP	5,28,380	34.57	3,27,253	21.41
42	Birbhum	81.91%▼	Satabdi Roy	AITC	7,17,961	47.00	Debtanu Bhattacharya	BJP	5,20,311	34.06	1,97,650	12.94

== Assembly wise lead of Parties ==
=== Partywise leads ===
2024 Lok Sabha in West Bengal by Assembly Segment

Party		Assembly segments	Position in assembly (after 2026 election)
AITC+	AITC	192	80
AITC+	Total	192	80
NDA	BJP	90	208
NDA	Total	90	208
INDIA	INC	11	2
INDIA	CPI(M)	1	1
INDIA	Total	12	3
Others	AJUP	Did not exist	2
Others	AISF	0	1
Others	Total	0	3
Total		294	

=== Assembly seat wise leads ===
Constituency		Winner			Runner Up			Third			Margin
#	Name	Candidate	Party	Votes	Candidate	Party	Votes	Candidate	Party	Votes	Margin
Cooch Behar Lok Sabha constituency
2	Mathabhanga (SC)	Nisith Pramanik	BJP	1,10,612	Jagadish Basunia	AITC	99,974	Nitish Chandra Roy	AIFB	4,197	10,638
3	Cooch Behar Uttar (SC)	Nisith Pramanik	BJP	1,23,859	Jagadish Basunia	AITC	1,05,870	Nitish Chandra Roy	AIFB	6,251	17,989
4	Cooch Behar Dakshin	Jagadish Basunia	AITC	95,092	Nisith Pramanik	BJP	87,383	Nitish Chandra Roy	AIFB	5,275	7,709
5	Sitalkuchi (SC)	Jagadish Basunia	AITC	1,29,633	Nisith Pramanik	BJP	1,13,357	Nitish Chandra Roy	AIFB	4,147	16,276
6	Sitai (SC)	Jagadish Basunia	AITC	1,28,189	Nisith Pramanik	BJP	99,812	Nitish Chandra Roy	AIFB	2,162	28,337
7	Dinhata	Jagadish Basunia	AITC	1,23,072	Nisith Pramanik	BJP	1,05,058	Nitish Chandra Roy	AIFB	3,263	18,014
8	Natabari	Nisith Pramanik	BJP	1,05,063	Jagadish Basunia	AITC	1,03,917	Nitish Chandra Roy	AIFB	4,697	1,146
Alipurduars Lok Sabha constituency
9	Tufanganj	Manoj Tigga	BJP	1,04,302	Prakash Chik Baraik	AITC	97,087	Mili Oraon	RSP	4,316	7,215
10	Kumargram (ST)	Manoj Tigga	BJP	1,10,394	Prakash Chik Baraik	AITC	1,02,753	Mili Oraon	RSP	6,514	7,641
11	Kalchini (ST)	Manoj Tigga	BJP	96,931	Prakash Chik Baraik	AITC	81,526	Mili Oraon	RSP	2,954	15,405
12	Alipurduars	Manoj Tigga	BJP	1,14,821	Prakash Chik Baraik	AITC	86,257	Mili Oraon	RSP	7,266	28,564
13	Falakata (SC)	Manoj Tigga	BJP	1,05,972	Prakash Chik Baraik	AITC	97,006	Mili Oraon	RSP	6,704	8,966
14	Madarihat (ST)	Manoj Tigga	BJP	79,921	Prakash Chik Baraik	AITC	68,858	Mili Oraon	RSP	4,043	11,063
21	Nagrakata (ST)	Prakash Chik Baraik	AITC	83,279	Manoj Tigga	BJP	79,732	Mili Oraon	RSP	7,627	3,547
Jalpaiguri Lok Sabha constituency
1	Mekliganj (SC)	Nirmal Chandra Roy	AITC	94,842	Jayanta Kumar Roy	BJP	92,024	Debraj Barman	CPI(M)	6,115	2,818
15	Dhupguri (SC)	Jayanta Kumar Roy	BJP	1,06,651	Nirmal Chandra Roy	AITC	1,00,322	Debraj Barman	CPI(M)	9,733	6,329
16	Maynaguri (SC)	Jayanta Kumar Roy	BJP	1,12,763	Nirmal Chandra Roy	AITC	1,08,018	Debraj Barman	CPI(M)	5,988	4,745
17	Jalpaiguri (SC)	Jayanta Kumar Roy	BJP	1,10,008	Nirmal Chandra Roy	AITC	84,474	Debraj Barman	CPI(M)	20,119	25,534
18	Rajganj (SC)	Nirmal Chandra Roy	AITC	1,04,594	Jayanta Kumar Roy	BJP	97,114	Debraj Barman	CPI(M)	10,781	7,480
19	Dabgram-Fulbari	Jayanta Kumar Roy	BJP	1,56,023	Nirmal Chandra Roy	AITC	83,778	Debraj Barman	CPI(M)	11,486	72,245
20	Mal (ST)	Nirmal Chandra Roy	AITC	1,01,468	Jayanta Kumar Roy	BJP	88,653	Debraj Barman	CPI(M)	9,407	12,815
Darjeeling Lok Sabha constituency
22	Kalimpong	Raju Bista	BJP	77,745	Gopal Lama	AITC	54,113	Munish Tamang	INC	6,092	23,632
23	Darjeeling	Raju Bista	BJP	87,252	Gopal Lama	AITC	55,907	Munish Tamang	INC	6,691	31,345
24	Kurseong	Raju Bista	BJP	93,981	Gopal Lama	AITC	55,474	Munish Tamang	INC	5,075	38,507
25	Matigara-Naxalbari (SC)	Raju Bista	BJP	1,54,140	Gopal Lama	AITC	70,185	Munish Tamang	INC	15,190	83,955
26	Siliguri	Raju Bista	BJP	1,14,570	Gopal Lama	AITC	48,561	Munish Tamang	INC	10,732	66,009
27	Phansidewa (ST)	Raju Bista	BJP	1,06,491	Gopal Lama	AITC	81,273	Munish Tamang	INC	13,309	25,218
28	Chopra	Gopal Lama	AITC	1,33,276	Raju Bista	BJP	41,145	Munish Tamang	INC	25,508	92,131
Raiganj Lok Sabha constituency
29	Islampur	Krishna Kalyani	AITC	86,994	Kartick Chandra Paul	BJP	62,987	Ali Imran Ramz	INC	15,536	24,007
30	Goalpokhar	Krishna Kalyani	AITC	67,554	Ali Imran Ramz	INC	66,888	Kartick Chandra Paul	BJP	31,884	666
31	Chakulia	Ali Imran Ramz	INC	59,825	Krishna Kalyani	AITC	58,653	Kartick Chandra Paul	BJP	51,774	1,172
32	Karandighi	Kartick Chandra Paul	BJP	86,135	Krishna Kalyani	AITC	64,563	Ali Imran Ramz	INC	55,046	21,572
33	Hemtabad (SC)	Kartick Chandra Paul	BJP	96,161	Krishna Kalyani	AITC	88,366	Ali Imran Ramz	INC	33,115	7,795
34	Kaliaganj (SC)	Kartick Chandra Paul	BJP	1,36,301	Krishna Kalyani	AITC	78,357	Ali Imran Ramz	INC	17,807	57,944
35	Raiganj	Kartick Chandra Paul	BJP	93,402	Krishna Kalyani	AITC	46,663	Ali Imran Ramz	INC	14,477	46,739
Balurghat Lok Sabha constituency
36	Itahar	Biplab Mitra	AITC	97,697	Sukanta Majumdar	BJP	66,928	Joydeb Siddhanta	RSP	10,999	30,769
37	Kushmandi (SC)	Biplab Mitra	AITC	85,929	Sukanta Majumdar	BJP	81,406	Joydeb Siddhanta	RSP	8,983	4,523
38	Kumarganj	Biplab Mitra	AITC	88,900	Sukanta Majumdar	BJP	65,861	Joydeb Siddhanta	RSP	6,838	23,039
39	Balurghat	Sukanta Majumdar	BJP	89,824	Biplab Mitra	AITC	47,467	Joydeb Siddhanta	RSP	7,427	42,357
40	Tapan (ST)	Sukanta Majumdar	BJP	95,548	Biplab Mitra	AITC	76,447	Joydeb Siddhanta	RSP	5,744	19,101
41	Gangarampur (SC)	Sukanta Majumdar	BJP	93,813	Biplab Mitra	AITC	77,013	Joydeb Siddhanta	RSP	6,382	16,800
42	Harirampur	Biplab Mitra	AITC	89,799	Sukanta Majumdar	BJP	79,545	Joydeb Siddhanta	RSP	7,708	10,254
Maldaha Uttar Lok Sabha constituency
43	Habibpur (ST)	Khagen Murmu	BJP	1,05,449	Prasun Banerjee	AITC	68,497	Mostaque Alam	INC	10,645	36,952
44	Gazole (SC)	Khagen Murmu	BJP	1,13,071	Prasun Banerjee	AITC	74,200	Mostaque Alam	INC	25,215	38,871
45	Chanchal	Mostaque Alam	INC	67,265	Prasun Banerjee	AITC	66,911	Khagen Murmu	BJP	50,623	354
46	Harishchandrapur	Mostaque Alam	INC	74,109	Prasun Banerjee	AITC	69,766	Khagen Murmu	BJP	49,433	4,343
47	Malatipur	Mostaque Alam	INC	77,720	Prasun Banerjee	AITC	61,799	Khagen Murmu	BJP	36,156	15,921
48	Ratua	Mostaque Alam	INC	91,880	Prasun Banerjee	AITC	58,021	Khagen Murmu	BJP	57,908	33,859
50	Maldaha	Khagen Murmu	BJP	1,12,469	Prasun Banerjee	AITC	49,040	Mostaque Alam	INC	37,229	63,429
Maldaha Dakshin Lok Sabha constituency
49	Manikchak	Sreerupa Mitra Chaudhury	BJP	82,081	Isha Khan Choudhury	INC	73,546	Shahnawaz Ali Raihan	AITC	33,371	8,535
51	English Bazar	Sreerupa Mitra Chaudhury	BJP	1,34,222	Isha Khan Choudhury	INC	51,350	Shahnawaz Ali Raihan	AITC	35,414	82,872
52	Mothabari	Isha Khan Choudhury	INC	77,235	Sreerupa Mitra Chaudhury	BJP	43,101	Shahnawaz Ali Raihan	AITC	31,547	34,134
53	Sujapur	Isha Khan Choudhury	INC	1,29,420	Shahnawaz Ali Raihan	AITC	45,791	Sreerupa Mitra Chaudhury	BJP	18,094	83,629
54	Baisnabnagar	Sreerupa Mitra Chaudhury	BJP	87,953	Isha Khan Choudhury	INC	68,031	Shahnawaz Ali Raihan	AITC	46,966	19,922
55	Farakka	Isha Khan Choudhury	INC	87,765	Sreerupa Mitra Chaudhury	BJP	47,232	Shahnawaz Ali Raihan	AITC	36,931	40,533
56	Samserganj	Isha Khan Choudhury	INC	83,619	Shahnawaz Ali Raihan	AITC	69,805	Sreerupa Mitra Chaudhury	BJP	28,848	13,814
Jangipur Lok Sabha constituency
57	Suti	Khalilur Rahaman	AITC	83,094	Murtaza Hossain	INC	63,171	Dhananjay Ghosh	BJP	54,152	19,923
58	Jangipur	Dhananjay Ghosh	BJP	73,808	Khalilur Rahaman	AITC	70,542	Murtaza Hossain	INC	54,090	3,266
59	Raghunathganj	Khalilur Rahaman	AITC	77,126	Murtaza Hossain	INC	73,369	Dhananjay Ghosh	BJP	27,057	3,757
60	Sagardighi	Khalilur Rahaman	AITC	82,062	Murtaza Hossain	INC	50,289	Dhananjay Ghosh	BJP	42,742	31,773
61	Lalgola	Murtaza Hossain	INC	81,745	Khalilur Rahaman	AITC	67,607	Dhananjay Ghosh	BJP	29,039	14,138
65	Nabagram (SC)	Khalilur Rahaman	AITC	81,122	Murtaza Hossain	INC	61,484	Dhananjay Ghosh	BJP	58,322	19,638
66	Khargram (SC)	Khalilur Rahaman	AITC	81,896	Dhananjay Ghosh	BJP	54,748	Murtaza Hossain	INC	42,957	27,148
Baharampur Lok Sabha constituency
67	Burwan (SC)	Nirmal Kumar Saha	BJP	63,476	Yusuf Pathan	AITC	62,918	Adhir Ranjan Chowdhury	INC	39,064	558
68	Kandi	Yusuf Pathan	AITC	72,763	Adhir Ranjan Chowdhury	INC	59,808	Nirmal Kumar Saha	BJP	50,003	12,953
69	Bharatpur	Yusuf Pathan	AITC	78,514	Adhir Ranjan Chowdhury	INC	59,956	Nirmal Kumar Saha	BJP	39,385	18,558
70	Rejinagar	Yusuf Pathan	AITC	96,834	Adhir Ranjan Chowdhury	INC	54,706	Nirmal Kumar Saha	BJP	50,425	42,128
71	Beldanga	Yusuf Pathan	AITC	77,122	Adhir Ranjan Chowdhury	INC	72,667	Nirmal Kumar Saha	BJP	50,060	4,445
72	Baharampur	Adhir Ranjan Chowdhury	INC	83,401	Nirmal Kumar Saha	BJP	76,474	Yusuf Pathan	AITC	46,994	6,927
74	Nowda	Yusuf Pathan	AITC	88,485	Adhir Ranjan Chowdhury	INC	68,569	Nirmal Kumar Saha	BJP	40,547	19,916
Murshidabad Lok Sabha constituency
62	Bhagabangola	Abu Taher Khan	AITC	1,10,857	Mohammed Salim	CPI(M)	87,081	Gouri Shankar Ghosh	BJP	18,490	23,776
63	Raninagar	Mohammed Salim	CPI(M)	96,310	Abu Taher Khan	AITC	95,589	Gouri Shankar Ghosh	BJP	20,495	721
64	Murshidabad	Gouri Shankar Ghosh	BJP	94,164	Abu Taher Khan	AITC	86,313	Mohammed Salim	CPI(M)	40,651	7,851
73	Hariharpara	Abu Taher Khan	AITC	97,299	Mohammed Salim	CPI(M)	74,917	Gouri Shankar Ghosh	BJP	24,320	22,382
75	Domkal	Abu Taher Khan	AITC	1,08,805	Mohammed Salim	CPI(M)	95,334	Gouri Shankar Ghosh	BJP	12,065	13,471
76	Jalangi	Abu Taher Khan	AITC	89,482	Mohammed Salim	CPI(M)	83,724	Gouri Shankar Ghosh	BJP	40,473	5,758
77	Karimpur	Abu Taher Khan	AITC	93,329	Gouri Shankar Ghosh	BJP	81,006	Mohammed Salim	CPI(M)	39,716	12,323
Krishnanagar Lok Sabha constituency
78	Tehatta	Amrita Roy	BJP	94,589	Mahua Moitra	AITC	86,233	S. M. Saadi	CPI(M)	28,459	8,356
79	Palashipara	Mahua Moitra	AITC	97,667	Amrita Roy	BJP	63,567	S. M. Saadi	CPI(M)	29,364	34,100
80	Kaliganj	Mahua Moitra	AITC	94,018	Amrita Roy	BJP	63,245	S. M. Saadi	CPI(M)	36,698	30,773
81	Nakashipara	Mahua Moitra	AITC	90,441	Amrita Roy	BJP	84,342	S. M. Saadi	CPI(M)	24,373	6,099
82	Chapra	Mahua Moitra	AITC	1,13,538	Amrita Roy	BJP	56,663	S. M. Saadi	CPI(M)	25,084	56,875
83	Krishnanagar Uttar	Amrita Roy	BJP	1,19,038	Mahua Moitra	AITC	65,568	S. M. Saadi	CPI(M)	11,848	53,470
85	Krishnanagar Dakshin	Amrita Roy	BJP	86,814	Mahua Moitra	AITC	77,246	S. M. Saadi	CPI(M)	23,237	9,568
Ranaghat Lok Sabha constituency
84	Nabadwip	Mukut Mani Adhikari	AITC	92,208	Jagannath Sarkar	BJP	86,652	Alokesh Das	CPI(M)	24,346	5,556
86	Shantipur	Jagannath Sarkar	BJP	1,10,823	Mukut Mani Adhikari	AITC	80,876	Alokesh Das	CPI(M)	17,526	29,947
87	Ranaghat Uttar Paschim	Jagannath Sarkar	BJP	1,15,286	Mukut Mani Adhikari	AITC	81,087	Alokesh Das	CPI(M)	17,816	34,199
88	Krishnaganj (SC)	Jagannath Sarkar	BJP	1,18,880	Mukut Mani Adhikari	AITC	91,755	Alokesh Das	CPI(M)	12,761	27,125
89	Ranaghat Uttar Purba (SC)	Jagannath Sarkar	BJP	1,18,534	Mukut Mani Adhikari	AITC	79,135	Alokesh Das	CPI(M)	10,347	39,399
90	Ranaghat Dakshin (SC)	Jagannath Sarkar	BJP	1,23,568	Mukut Mani Adhikari	AITC	86,632	Alokesh Das	CPI(M)	21,219	36,936
91	Chakdaha	Jagannath Sarkar	BJP	1,04,303	Mukut Mani Adhikari	AITC	80,583	Alokesh Das	CPI(M)	18,955	23,720
Bongaon Lok Sabha constituency
92	Kalyani (SC)	Shantanu Thakur	BJP	1,04,680	Biswajit Das	AITC	94,258	Pradip Biswas	INC	11,707	10,422
93	Haringhata (SC)	Shantanu Thakur	BJP	98,538	Biswajit Das	AITC	87,769	Pradip Biswas	INC	7,258	10,769
94	Bagdah (SC)	Shantanu Thakur	BJP	1,12,704	Biswajit Das	AITC	92,090	Pradip Biswas	INC	4,839	20,614
95	Bongaon Uttar (SC)	Shantanu Thakur	BJP	1,09,848	Biswajit Das	AITC	84,818	Pradip Biswas	INC	7,066	25,030
96	Bongaon Dakshin (SC)	Shantanu Thakur	BJP	1,08,457	Biswajit Das	AITC	89,780	Pradip Biswas	INC	4,956	18,677
97	Gaighata (SC)	Shantanu Thakur	BJP	1,15,191	Biswajit Das	AITC	88,186	Pradip Biswas	INC	7,671	27,005
98	Swarupnagar (SC)	Biswajit Das	AITC	1,06,752	Shantanu Thakur	BJP	67,534	Pradip Biswas	INC	21,362	39,218
Barrackpore Lok Sabha constituency
102	Amdanga	Partha Bhowmick	AITC	1,04,500	Arjun Singh	BJP	69,227	Debdut Ghosh	CPI(M)	16,811	35,273
103	Bijpur	Partha Bhowmick	AITC	64,742	Arjun Singh	BJP	55,071	Debdut Ghosh	CPI(M)	13,778	9,671
104	Naihati	Partha Bhowmick	AITC	75,390	Arjun Singh	BJP	59,872	Debdut Ghosh	CPI(M)	14,925	15,518
105	Bhatpara	Arjun Singh	BJP	58,084	Partha Bhowmick	AITC	40,621	Debdut Ghosh	CPI(M)	4,592	17,463
106	Jagaddal	Partha Bhowmick	AITC	81,963	Arjun Singh	BJP	75,979	Debdut Ghosh	CPI(M)	17,473	5,984
107	Noapara	Partha Bhowmick	AITC	86,737	Arjun Singh	BJP	74,878	Debdut Ghosh	CPI(M)	24,497	11,859
108	Barrackpore	Partha Bhowmick	AITC	64,533	Arjun Singh	BJP	61,073	Debdut Ghosh	CPI(M)	16,962	3,460
Dum Dum Lok Sabha constituency
109	Khardaha	Saugata Roy	AITC	81,000	Shilbadra Dutta	BJP	70,028	Sujan Chakraborty	CPI(M)	32,719	10,972
110	Dum Dum Uttar	Saugata Roy	AITC	86,417	Shilbhadra Dutta	BJP	80,115	Sujan Chakraborty	CPI(M)	45,096	6,302
111	Panihati	Saugata Roy	AITC	71,909	Shilbhadra Dutta	BJP	59,474	Sujan Chakraborty	CPI(M)	35,849	12,435
112	Kamarhati	Saugata Roy	AITC	62,011	Shilbhadra Dutta	BJP	43,211	Sujan Chakraborty	CPI(M)	33,082	18,800
113	Baranagar	Saugata Roy	AITC	69,427	Shilbhadra Dutta	BJP	57,450	Sujan Chakraborty	CPI(M)	29,572	11,977
114	Dum Dum	Saugata Roy	AITC	80,289	Shilbhadra Dutta	BJP	70,698	Sujan Chakraborty	CPI(M)	32,714	9,591
117	Rajarhat Gopalpur	Saugata Roy	AITC	75,236	Shilbhadra Dutta	BJP	75,162	Sujan Chakraborty	CPI(M)	30,386	74
Barasat Lok Sabha constituency
100	Habra	Swapan Majumder	BJP	1,02,089	Kakoli Ghosh Dastidar	AITC	82,156	Sanjib Chatterjee	AIFB	9,314	19,933
101	Ashoknagar	Kakoli Ghosh Dastidar	AITC	97,801	Swapan Majumder	BJP	84,707	Tapas Banerjee	AISF	21,183	13,094
115	Rajarhat New Town	Kakoli Ghosh Dastidar	AITC	1,19,822	Swapan Majumder	BJP	91,405	Sanjib Chatterjee	AIFB	15,858	28,417
116	Bidhannagar	Swapan Majumder	BJP	78,883	Kakoli Ghosh Dastidar	AITC	67,727	Sanjib Chatterjee	AIFB	13,936	11,156
118	Madhyamgram	Kakoli Ghosh Dastidar	AITC	1,10,832	Swapan Majumder	BJP	79,182	Tapas Banerjee	AISF	20,216	31,650
119	Barasat	Kakoli Ghosh Dastidar	AITC	1,00,548	Swapan Majumder	BJP	97,376	Sanjib Chatterjee	AIFB	21,900	3,172
120	Deganga	Kakoli Ghosh Dastidar	AITC	1,10,627	Tapas Banerjee	AISF	50,249	Swapan Majumder	BJP	42,382	60,378
Basirhat Lok Sabha constituency
99	Baduria	Haji Nurul Islam	AITC	1,09,296	Rekha Patra	BJP	58,734	Akhtar Rahaman Biswas	AISF	20,281	50,562
121	Haroa	Haji Nurul Islam	AITC	1,45,356	Akhtar Rahaman Biswas	AISF	34,365	Rekha Patra	BJP	34,235	1,10,991
122	Minakhan (SC)	Haji Nurul Islam	AITC	1,22,957	Rekha Patra	BJP	51,789	Akhtar Rahaman Biswas	AISF	25,204	71,168
123	Sandeshkhali (ST)	Rekha Patra	BJP	95,862	Haji Nurul Islam	AITC	87,475	Akhtar Rahaman Biswas	AISF	7,566	8,387
124	Basirhat Dakshin	Haji Nurul Islam	AITC	1,10,182	Rekha Patra	BJP	95,159	Nirapada Sardar	CPI(M)	12,129	15,023
125	Basirhat Uttar	Haji Nurul Islam	AITC	1,34,562	Rekha Patra	BJP	51,607	Nirapada Sardar	CPI(M)	22,574	82,955
126	Hingalganj (SC)	Haji Nurul Islam	AITC	91,714	Rekha Patra	BJP	81,207	Nirapada Sardar	CPI(M)	7,190	10,507
Joynagar Lok Sabha constituency
127	Gosaba (SC)	Pratima Mondal	AITC	1,01,627	Ashok Kandari	BJP	74,775	Meghnath Halder	AISF	3,171	26,852
128	Basanti (SC)	Pratima Mondal	AITC	1,32,044	Ashok Kandari	BJP	54,043	Meghnath Halder	AISF	12,304	78,001
129	Kultali (SC)	Pratima Mondal	AITC	1,18,358	Ashok Kandari	BJP	79,951	Meghnath Halder	AISF	9,306	38,407
136	Joynagar (SC)	Pratima Mondal	AITC	1,11,757	Ashok Kandari	BJP	69,467	Samarendra Nath Mandal	RSP	5,848	42,290
138	Canning Paschim (SC)	Pratima Mondal	AITC	1,32,888	Ashok Kandari	BJP	63,026	Meghnath Halder	AISF	14,867	69,862
139	Canning Purba	Pratima Mondal	AITC	1,84,569	Ashok Kandari	BJP	18,345	Meghnath Halder	AISF	17,516	1,66,224
141	Magrahat Purba (SC)	Pratima Mondal	AITC	1,09,810	Ashok Kandari	BJP	62,939	Samarendra Nath Mandal	RSP	20,646	46,871
Mathurapur Lok Sabha constituency
130	Patharpratima	Bapi Halder	AITC	1,14,889	Ashok Purkait	BJP	89,717	Sarat Chandra Halder	CPI(M)	9,103	25,172
131	Kakdwip	Bapi Halder	AITC	1,11,884	Ashok Purkait	BJP	86,478	Ajay Kumar Das	AISF	9,596	25,406
132	Sagar	Bapi Halder	AITC	1,20,963	Ashok Purkait	BJP	1,02,248	Sarat Chandra Halder	CPI(M)	7,409	18,715
133	Kulpi	Bapi Halder	AITC	92,773	Ashok Purkait	BJP	60,727	Ajay Kumar Das	AISF	24,729	32,046
134	Raidighi	Bapi Halder	AITC	1,13,701	Ashok Purkait	BJP	92,764	Ajay Kumar Das	AISF	13,444	20,937
135	Mandirbazar (SC)	Bapi Halder	AITC	93,939	Ashok Purkait	BJP	73,528	Ajay Kumar Das	AISF	15,549	20,411
142	Magrahat Paschim	Bapi Halder	AITC	1,04,337	Ashok Purkait	BJP	47,336	Ajay Kumar Das	AISF	17,457	57,001
Diamond Harbour Lok Sabha constituency
143	Diamond Harbour	Abhishek Banerjee	AITC	1,47,343	Abhijit Das	BJP	43,176	Majnu Laskar	AISF	9,918	1,04,167
144	Falta	Abhishek Banerjee	AITC	1,83,635	Abhijit Das	BJP	15,263	Pratikur Rahaman	CPI(M)	2,315	1,68,372
145	Satgachhia	Abhishek Banerjee	AITC	1,36,067	Abhijit Das	BJP	75,449	Pratikur Rahaman	CPI(M)	13,537	60,618
146	Bishnupur (SC)	Abhishek Banerjee	AITC	1,40,709	Abhijit Das	BJP	69,557	Pratikur Rahaman	CPI(M)	16,439	71,152
155	Maheshtala	Abhishek Banerjee	AITC	1,30,063	Abhijit Das	BJP	60,525	Pratikur Rahaman	CPI(M)	22,105	69,538
156	Budge Budge	Abhishek Banerjee	AITC	1,59,780	Abhijit Das	BJP	41,942	Pratikur Rahaman	CPI(M)	8,087	1,17,838
157	Metiaburuz	Abhishek Banerjee	AITC	1,45,896	Abhijit Das	BJP	30,156	Pratikur Rahaman	CPI(M)	16,664	1,15,740
Jadavpur Lok Sabha constituency
137	Baruipur Purba (SC)	Saayoni Ghosh	AITC	1,18,938	Anirban Ganguly	BJP	70,162	Srijan Bhattacharya	CPI(M)	22,606	48,776
140	Baruipur Paschim	Saayoni Ghosh	AITC	1,05,413	Anirban Ganguly	BJP	65,165	Srijan Bhattacharya	CPI(M)	34,383	40,248
147	Sonarpur Dakshin	Saayoni Ghosh	AITC	97,628	Anirban Ganguly	BJP	87,909	Srijan Bhattacharya	CPI(M)	40,696	9,719
148	Bhangar	Saayoni Ghosh	AITC	1,16,486	Nur Alam Khan	AISF	75,004	Anirban Ganguly	BJP	29,211	41,482
150	Jadavpur	Saayoni Ghosh	AITC	81,897	Anirban Ganguly	BJP	64,048	Srijan Bhattacharya	CPI(M)	59,987	17,849
151	Sonarpur Uttar	Saayoni Ghosh	AITC	1,16,671	Anirban Ganguly	BJP	84,031	Srijan Bhattacharya	CPI(M)	38,164	32,640
152	Tollygunge	Saayoni Ghosh	AITC	77,016	Anirban Ganguly	BJP	56,781	Srijan Bhattacharya	CPI(M)	50,856	20,235
Kolkata Dakshin Lok Sabha constituency
149	Kasba	Mala Roy	AITC	1,18,379	Debasree Chaudhuri	BJP	71,529	Saira Shah Halim	CPI(M)	29,641	46,850
153	Behala Purba	Mala Roy	AITC	97,125	Debasree Chaudhuri	BJP	81,899	Saira Shah Halim	CPI(M)	30,471	15,226
154	Behala Paschim	Mala Roy	AITC	96,209	Debasree Chaudhuri	BJP	81,013	Saira Shah Halim	CPI(M)	37,507	15,196
158	Kolkata Port	Mala Roy	AITC	84,816	Debasree Chaudhuri	BJP	41,923	Saira Shah Halim	CPI(M)	21,904	42,893
159	Bhabanipur	Mala Roy	AITC	62,461	Debasree Chaudhuri	BJP	54,164	Saira Shah Halim	CPI(M)	14,006	8,297
160	Rashbehari	Mala Roy	AITC	57,905	Debasree Chaudhuri	BJP	56,214	Saira Shah Halim	CPI(M)	15,003	1,691
161	Ballygunge	Mala Roy	AITC	95,830	Debasree Chaudhuri	BJP	39,717	Saira Shah Halim	CPI(M)	19,239	56,113
Kolkata Uttar Lok Sabha constituency
162	Chowrangee	Sudip Bandyopadhyay	AITC	55,031	Tapas Roy	BJP	40,386	Pradip Bhattacharya	INC	18,285	14,645
163	Entally	Sudip Bandyopadhyay	AITC	83,446	Tapas Roy	BJP	54,317	Pradip Bhattacharya	INC	24,305	29,129
164	Beleghata	Sudip Bandyopadhyay	AITC	92,643	Tapas Roy	BJP	46,531	Pradip Bhattacharya	INC	24,706	46,112
165	Jorasanko	Tapas Roy	BJP	49,294	Sudip Bandyopadhyay	AITC	41,893	Pradip Bhattacharya	INC	12,293	7,401
166	Shyampukur	Tapas Roy	BJP	49,662	Sudip Bandyopadhyay	AITC	48,063	Pradip Bhattacharya	INC	9,528	1,599
167	Maniktala	Sudip Bandyopadhyay	AITC	66,964	Tapas Roy	BJP	63,389	Pradip Bhattacharya	INC	9,421	3,515
168	Kashipur-Belgachhia	Sudip Bandyopadhyay	AITC	65,137	Tapas Roy	BJP	57,869	Pradip Bhattacharya	INC	16,018	7,268
Howrah Lok Sabha constituency
169	Bally	Prasun Banerjee	AITC	52,906	Rathin Chakraborty	BJP	46,414	Sabyasachi Chatterjee	CPI(M)	16,217	6,492
170	Howrah Uttar	Prasun Banerjee	AITC	69,826	Rathin Chakraborty	BJP	59,795	Sabyasachi Chatterjee	CPI(M)	8,936	10,031
171	Howrah Madhya	Prasun Banerjee	AITC	94,136	Rathin Chakraborty	BJP	68,821	Sabyasachi Chatterjee	CPI(M)	21,264	25,315
172	Shibpur	Prasun Banerjee	AITC	79,464	Rathin Chakraborty	BJP	65,258	Sabyasachi Chatterjee	CPI(M)	26,171	14,206
173	Howrah Dakshin	Prasun Banerjee	AITC	1,02,763	Rathin Chakraborty	BJP	73,091	Sabyasachi Chatterjee	CPI(M)	29,236	29,672
174	Sankrail (SC)	Prasun Banerjee	AITC	1,03,109	Rathin Chakraborty	BJP	76,250	Sabyasachi Chatterjee	CPI(M)	32,406	26,859
175	Panchla	Prasun Banerjee	AITC	1,23,025	Rathin Chakraborty	BJP	66,367	Sabyasachi Chatterjee	CPI(M)	17,253	56,658
Uluberia Lok Sabha constituency
176	Uluberia Purba	Sajda Ahmed	AITC	91,924	Arun Uday Paul Chowdhury	BJP	67,498	Azahar Mollick	INC	19,260	24,426
177	Uluberia Uttar (SC)	Sajda Ahmed	AITC	89,361	Arun Uday Paul Chowdhury	BJP	71,358	Azahar Mollick	INC	8,116	18,003
178	Uluberia Dakshin	Sajda Ahmed	AITC	1,03,696	Arun Uday Paul Chowdhury	BJP	70,563	Mofikul Islam	AISF	10,107	33,133
179	Shyampur	Sajda Ahmed	AITC	1,13,532	Arun Uday Paul Chowdhury	BJP	83,619	Azahar Mollick	INC	9,981	29,913
180	Bagnan	Sajda Ahmed	AITC	1,07,616	Arun Uday Paul Chowdhury	BJP	69,143	Azahar Mollick	INC	10,921	38,473
181	Amta	Sajda Ahmed	AITC	1,01,868	Arun Uday Paul Chowdhury	BJP	74,370	Azahar Mollick	INC	15,984	27,498
182	Udaynarayanpur	Sajda Ahmed	AITC	1,14,589	Arun Uday Paul Chowdhury	BJP	68,060	Azahar Mollick	INC	4,739	46,529
Sreerampur Lok Sabha constituency
183	Jagatballavpur	Kalyan Banerjee	AITC	1,13,092	Kabir Shankar Bose	BJP	86,482	Dipsita Dhar	CPI(M)	20,433	26,610
184	Domjur	Kalyan Banerjee	AITC	1,29,382	Kabir Shankar Bose	BJP	70,669	Dipsita Dhar	CPI(M)	36,768	58,713
185	Uttarpara	Kalyan Banerjee	AITC	74,618	Kabir Shankar Bose	BJP	65,578	Dipsita Dhar	CPI(M)	50,328	9,040
186	Sreerampur	Kalyan Banerjee	AITC	71,927	Kabir Shankar Bose	BJP	64,106	Dipsita Dhar	CPI(M)	42,033	7,821
187	Champdani	Kalyan Banerjee	AITC	80,759	Kabir Shankar Bose	BJP	72,168	Dipsita Dhar	CPI(M)	38,206	8,591
194	Chanditala	Kalyan Banerjee	AITC	99,001	Kabir Shankar Bose	BJP	63,651	Dipsita Dhar	CPI(M)	31,562	35,350
195	Jangipara	Kalyan Banerjee	AITC	1,03,086	Kabir Shankar Bose	BJP	75,066	Dipsita Dhar	CPI(M)	18,801	28,080
Hooghly Lok Sabha constituency
188	Singur	Rachna Banerjee	AITC	1,02,740	Locket Chatterjee	BJP	83,914	Manadip Ghosh	CPI(M)	17,769	18,826
189	Chandannagar	Rachna Banerjee	AITC	79,222	Locket Chatterjee	BJP	72,758	Manadip Ghosh	CPI(M)	23,209	6,464
190	Chunchura	Locket Chatterjee	BJP	1,12,760	Rachna Banerjee	AITC	1,04,496	Manadip Ghosh	CPI(M)	27,945	8,264
191	Balagarh (SC)	Locket Chatterjee	BJP	1,01,412	Rachna Banerjee	AITC	95,465	Manadip Ghosh	CPI(M)	15,359	5,947
192	Pandua	Rachna Banerjee	AITC	1,06,193	Locket Chatterjee	BJP	80,407	Manadip Ghosh	CPI(M)	30,041	25,786
193	Saptagram	Locket Chatterjee	BJP	87,760	Rachna Banerjee	AITC	85,268	Manadip Ghosh	CPI(M)	12,321	2,492
197	Dhanekhali (SC)	Rachna Banerjee	AITC	1,26,736	Locket Chatterjee	BJP	84,856	Manadip Ghosh	CPI(M)	12,606	41,880
Arambagh Lok Sabha constituency
196	Haripal	Mitali Bag	AITC	1,15,371	Arup Kanti Digar	BJP	82,912	Biplab Kumar Moitra	CPI(M)	16,776	32,459
198	Tarakeswar	Mitali Bag	AITC	97,685	Arup Kanti Digar	BJP	86,517	Biplab Kumar Moitra	CPI(M)	15,436	11,168
199	Pursurah	Arup Kanti Digar	BJP	1,14,636	Mitali Bag	AITC	91,744	Biplab Kumar Moitra	CPI(M)	9,585	22,892
200	Arambagh (SC)	Mitali Bag	AITC	98,847	Arup Kanti Digar	BJP	98,301	Biplab Kumar Moitra	CPI(M)	12,846	546
201	Goghat (SC)	Arup Kanti Digar	BJP	1,02,750	Mitali Bag	AITC	96,864	Biplab Kumar Moitra	CPI(M)	13,554	5,886
202	Khanakul	Arup Kanti Digar	BJP	1,07,165	Mitali Bag	AITC	90,043	Biplab Kumar Moitra	CPI(M)	10,977	17,122
232	Chandrakona (SC)	Mitali Bag	AITC	1,19,878	Arup Kanti Digar	BJP	1,11,843	Biplab Kumar Moitra	CPI(M)	12,899	8,035
Tamluk Lok Sabha constituency
203	Tamluk	Abhijit Gangopadhyay	BJP	1,18,398	Debangshu Bhattacharya	AITC	97,937	Sayan Banerjee	CPI(M)	15,533	20,461
204	Panskura Purba	Abhijit Gangopadhyay	BJP	91,249	Debangshu Bhattacharya	AITC	88,528	Sayan Banerjee	CPI(M)	13,050	2,721
206	Moyna	Abhijit Gangopadhyay	BJP	1,11,901	Debangshu Bhattacharya	AITC	1,01,953	Sayan Banerjee	CPI(M)	6,836	9,948
207	Nandakumar	Abhijit Gangopadhyay	BJP	1,10,754	Debangshu Bhattacharya	AITC	1,02,811	Sayan Banerjee	CPI(M)	12,144	7,943
208	Mahisadal	Abhijit Gangopadhyay	BJP	1,05,999	Debangshu Bhattacharya	AITC	96,545	Sayan Banerjee	CPI(M)	11,791	9,454
209	Haldia (SC)	Abhijit Gangopadhyay	BJP	1,10,772	Debangshu Bhattacharya	AITC	92,271	Sayan Banerjee	CPI(M)	17,846	18,501
210	Nandigram	Abhijit Gangopadhyay	BJP	1,12,110	Debangshu Bhattacharya	AITC	1,03,910	Sayan Banerjee	CPI(M)	7,574	8,200
Kanthi Lok Sabha constituency
211	Chandipur	Soumendu Adhikari	BJP	1,07,575	Uttam Barik	AITC	1,06,733	Urbashi Banerjee	INC	6,136	842
212	Patashpur	Uttam Barik	AITC	1,06,823	Soumendu Adhikari	BJP	98,215	Urbashi Banerjee	INC	4,344	8,608
213	Kanthi Uttar	Soumendu Adhikari	BJP	1,14,358	Uttam Barik	AITC	1,07,259	Urbashi Banerjee	INC	4,089	7,099
214	Bhagabanpur	Soumendu Adhikari	BJP	1,09,013	Uttam Barik	AITC	1,08,428	Urbashi Banerjee	INC	4,466	585
215	Khejuri (SC)	Soumendu Adhikari	BJP	1,14,648	Uttam Barik	AITC	94,365	Urbashi Banerjee	INC	3,030	20,283
216	Kanthi Dakshin	Soumendu Adhikari	BJP	1,02,675	Uttam Barik	AITC	83,901	Urbashi Banerjee	INC	4,768	18,774
217	Ramnagar	Soumendu Adhikari	BJP	1,11,422	Uttam Barik	AITC	1,02,254	Urbashi Banerjee	INC	3,904	9,168
Ghatal Lok Sabha constituency
205	Panskura Paschim	Hiran Chatterjee	BJP	1,08,415	Deepak Adhikari	AITC	1,08,239	Tapan Ganguly	CPI	10,390	176
226	Sabang	Deepak Adhikari	AITC	1,28,024	Hiran Chatterjee	BJP	95,341	Tapan Ganguly	CPI	9,466	32,683
227	Pingla	Deepak Adhikari	AITC	1,18,627	Hiran Chatterjee	BJP	98,714	Tapan Ganguly	CPI	8,340	19,913
229	Debra	Deepak Adhikari	AITC	94,559	Hiran Chatterjee	BJP	88,793	Tapan Ganguly	CPI	16,187	5,766
230	Daspur	Deepak Adhikari	AITC	1,13,690	Hiran Chatterjee	BJP	97,179	Tapan Ganguly	CPI	13,487	16,511
231	Ghatal (SC)	Deepak Adhikari	AITC	1,09,289	Hiran Chatterjee	BJP	1,04,884	Tapan Ganguly	CPI	8,582	4,405
235	Keshpur (SC)	Deepak Adhikari	AITC	1,62,130	Hiran Chatterjee	BJP	58,772	Tapan Ganguly	CPI	7,947	1,03,358
Jhargram Lok Sabha constituency
220	Nayagram (ST)	Kalipada Soren	AITC	96,788	Pranat Tudu	BJP	72,523	Sonamani Tudu	CPI(M)	6,246	24,265
221	Gopiballavpur	Kalipada Soren	AITC	1,01,255	Pranat Tudu	BJP	78,886	Sonamani Tudu	CPI(M)	6,594	22,369
222	Jhargram	Kalipada Soren	AITC	96,608	Pranat Tudu	BJP	82,507	Sonamani Tudu	CPI(M)	10,448	14,101
233	Garbeta	Kalipada Soren	AITC	1,06,763	Pranat Tudu	BJP	83,566	Sonamani Tudu	CPI(M)	9,685	23,197
234	Salboni	Kalipada Soren	AITC	1,32,226	Pranat Tudu	BJP	93,965	Sonamani Tudu	CPI(M)	14,715	38,261
237	Binpur (ST)	Kalipada Soren	AITC	94,318	Pranat Tudu	BJP	70,376	Sonamani Tudu	CPI(M)	8,713	23,942
238	Bandwan (ST)	Kalipada Soren	AITC	1,12,174	Pranat Tudu	BJP	84,730	Sonamani Tudu	CPI(M)	20,449	27,444
Medinipur Lok Sabha constituency
218	Egra	Agnimitra Paul	BJP	1,18,355	June Malia	AITC	1,09,357	Biplab Bhatta	CPI	6,912	8,998
219	Dantan	June Malia	AITC	96,274	Agnimitra Paul	BJP	89,940	Biplab Bhatta	CPI	4,626	6,334
223	Keshiary (ST)	June Malia	AITC	1,02,841	Agnimitra Paul	BJP	95,059	Biplab Bhatta	CPI	7,031	7,782
224	Kharagpur Sadar	Agnimitra Paul	BJP	87,722	June Malia	AITC	65,816	Biplab Bhatta	CPI	8,463	21,906
225	Narayangarh	June Malia	AITC	1,06,437	Agnimitra Paul	BJP	95,823	Biplab Bhatta	CPI	8,981	10,614
228	Kharagpur	June Malia	AITC	1,08,911	Agnimitra Paul	BJP	76,673	Biplab Bhatta	CPI	10,149	32,238
236	Medinipur	June Malia	AITC	1,09,926	Agnimitra Paul	BJP	1,07,756	Biplab Bhatta	CPI	11,183	2,170
Purulia Lok Sabha constituency
239	Balarampur	Shantiram Mahato	AITC	84,768	Jyotirmay Singh Mahato	BJP	83,618	Ajit Prasad Mahato	IND	14,292	1,150
240	Baghmundi	Jyotirmay Singh Mahato	BJP	83,393	Shantiram Mahato	AITC	72,153	Nepal Mahata	INC	29,589	11,240
241	Joypur	Shantiram Mahato	AITC	78,783	Jyotirmay Singh Mahato	BJP	72,222	Ajit Prasad Mahato	IND	25,441	6,561
242	Purulia	Jyotirmay Singh Mahato	BJP	92,666	Shantiram Mahato	AITC	70,287	Nepal Mahata	INC	21,445	22,379
243	Manbazar (ST)	Shantiram Mahato	AITC	95,653	Jyotirmay Singh Mahato	BJP	80,282	Nepal Mahata	INC	16,874	15,371
244	Kashipur	Shantiram Mahato	AITC	81,834	Jyotirmay Singh Mahato	BJP	79,968	Nepal Mahata	INC	13,513	1,866
245	Para (SC)	Jyotirmay Singh Mahato	BJP	84,097	Shantiram Mahato	AITC	75,847	Nepal Mahata	INC	12,982	8,250
Bankura Lok Sabha constituency
246	Raghunathpur (SC)	Arup Chakraborty	AITC	91,780	Subhash Sarkar	BJP	91,325	Nilanjan Dasgupta	CPI(M)	14,781	455
247	Saltora (SC)	Arup Chakraborty	AITC	92,657	Subhash Sarkar	BJP	81,557	Nilanjan Dasgupta	CPI(M)	14,643	11,100
248	Chhatna	Arup Chakraborty	AITC	89,912	Subhash Sarkar	BJP	84,255	Nilanjan Dasgupta	CPI(M)	11,064	5,657
249	Ranibandh (ST)	Arup Chakraborty	AITC	90,299	Subhash Sarkar	BJP	84,547	Nilanjan Dasgupta	CPI(M)	21,076	5,752
250	Raipur (ST)	Arup Chakraborty	AITC	94,729	Subhash Sarkar	BJP	77,235	Nilanjan Dasgupta	CPI(M)	11,369	17,494
251	Taldangra	Arup Chakraborty	AITC	90,790	Subhash Sarkar	BJP	82,307	Nilanjan Dasgupta	CPI(M)	16,525	8,483
252	Bankura	Subhash Sarkar	BJP	1,03,610	Arup Chakraborty	AITC	87,298	Nilanjan Dasgupta	CPI(M)	15,076	16,312
Bishnupur Lok Sabha constituency
253	Barjora	Saumitra Khan	BJP	1,01,567	Sujata Mondal	AITC	87,529	Sital Chandra Kaibartiya	CPI(M)	20,410	14,038
254	Onda	Saumitra Khan	BJP	1,04,894	Sujata Mondal	AITC	98,954	Sital Chandra Kaibartiya	CPI(M)	10,919	5,940
255	Bishnupur	Saumitra Khan	BJP	94,725	Sujata Mondal	AITC	79,683	Sital Chandra Kaibartiya	CPI(M)	12,653	15,042
256	Kotulpur (SC)	Saumitra Khan	BJP	1,04,935	Sujata Mondal	AITC	98,604	Sital Chandra Kaibartiya	CPI(M)	14,755	6,331
257	Indas (SC)	Sujata Mondal	AITC	1,06,056	Saumitra Khan	BJP	96,909	Sital Chandra Kaibartiya	CPI(M)	9,752	9,147
258	Sonamukhi (SC)	Saumitra Khan	BJP	1,00,705	Sujata Mondal	AITC	89,091	Sital Chandra Kaibartiya	CPI(M)	10,902	11,614
259	Khandaghosh (SC)	Sujata Mondal	AITC	1,11,231	Saumitra Khan	BJP	73,585	Sital Chandra Kaibartiya	CPI(M)	25,504	37,646
Bardhaman Purba Lok Sabha constituency
261	Raina (SC)	Sharmila Sarkar	AITC	1,14,862	Ashim Kumar Sarkar	BJP	71,297	Nirab Khan	CPI(M)	32,404	43,565
262	Jamalpur (SC)	Sharmila Sarkar	AITC	1,05,306	Ashim Kumar Sarkar	BJP	68,938	Nirab Khan	CPI(M)	26,536	36,368
264	Kalna (SC)	Sharmila Sarkar	AITC	94,368	Ashim Kumar Sarkar	BJP	84,209	Nirab Khan	CPI(M)	20,841	10,159
265	Memari	Sharmila Sarkar	AITC	1,06,306	Ashim Kumar Sarkar	BJP	73,475	Nirab Khan	CPI(M)	28,870	32,831
268	Purbasthali Dakshin	Sharmila Sarkar	AITC	1,02,656	Ashim Kumar Sarkar	BJP	81,294	Nirab Khan	CPI(M)	21,021	21,362
269	Purbasthali Uttar	Sharmila Sarkar	AITC	92,612	Ashim Kumar Sarkar	BJP	89,374	Nirab Khan	CPI(M)	23,112	3,238
270	Katwa	Sharmila Sarkar	AITC	1,01,771	Ashim Kumar Sarkar	BJP	89,356	Nirab Khan	CPI(M)	23,574	12,415
Bardhaman–Durgapur Lok Sabha constituency
260	Bardhaman Dakshin	Kirti Azad	AITC	92,692	Dilip Ghosh	BJP	85,404	Sukriti Ghoshal	CPI(M)	18,341	7,288
263	Monteshwar	Kirti Azad	AITC	1,13,438	Dilip Ghosh	BJP	67,696	Sukriti Ghoshal	CPI(M)	21,060	45,742
266	Bardhaman Uttar (SC)	Kirti Azad	AITC	1,23,368	Dilip Ghosh	BJP	82,123	Sukriti Ghoshal	CPI(M)	28,051	41,245
267	Bhatar	Kirti Azad	AITC	1,09,501	Dilip Ghosh	BJP	77,081	Sukriti Ghoshal	CPI(M)	21,051	32,420
274	Galsi (SC)	Kirti Azad	AITC	1,07,250	Dilip Ghosh	BJP	86,496	Sukriti Ghoshal	CPI(M)	21,539	20,754
276	Durgapur Purba	Kirti Azad	AITC	85,390	Dilip Ghosh	BJP	83,697	Sukriti Ghoshal	CPI(M)	24,669	1,693
277	Durgapur Paschim	Dilip Ghosh	BJP	97,112	Kirti Azad	AITC	85,430	Sukriti Ghoshal	CPI(M)	18,140	11,682
Asansol Lok Sabha constituency
275	Pandabeswar	Shatrughan Sinha	AITC	94,707	S. S. Ahluwalia	BJP	54,682	Jahanara Khan	CPI(M)	11,555	40,025
278	Raniganj	Shatrughan Sinha	AITC	83,685	S. S. Ahluwalia	BJP	79,233	Jahanara Khan	CPI(M)	21,326	4,452
279	Jamuria	Shatrughan Sinha	AITC	77,209	S. S. Ahluwalia	BJP	65,338	Jahanara Khan	CPI(M)	22,150	11,871
280	Asansol Dakshin	S. S. Ahluwalia	BJP	96,739	Shatrughan Sinha	AITC	84,582	Jahanara Khan	CPI(M)	16,897	12,157
281	Asansol Uttar	Shatrughan Sinha	AITC	94,825	S. S. Ahluwalia	BJP	90,458	Jahanara Khan	CPI(M)	11,772	4,367
282	Kulti	S. S. Ahluwalia	BJP	94,108	Shatrughan Sinha	AITC	79,055	Jahanara Khan	CPI(M)	7,183	15,053
283	Barabani	Shatrughan Sinha	AITC	89,042	S. S. Ahluwalia	BJP	63,519	Jahanara Khan	CPI(M)	14,571	25,523
Bolpur Lok Sabha constituency
271	Ketugram	Asit Kumar Mal	AITC	1,19,431	Piya Saha	BJP	73,419	Shyamali Pradhan	CPI(M)	13,824	46,012
272	Mangalkot	Asit Kumar Mal	AITC	1,17,318	Piya Saha	BJP	70,811	Shyamali Pradhan	CPI(M)	17,834	46,507
273	Ausgram (SC)	Asit Kumar Mal	AITC	1,10,503	Piya Saha	BJP	76,968	Shyamali Pradhan	CPI(M)	21,164	33,535
286	Bolpur	Asit Kumar Mal	AITC	1,29,462	Piya Saha	BJP	81,115	Shyamali Pradhan	CPI(M)	16,202	48,347
287	Nanoor (SC)	Asit Kumar Mal	AITC	1,48,830	Piya Saha	BJP	66,620	Shyamali Pradhan	CPI(M)	9,512	82,210
288	Labhpur	Asit Kumar Mal	AITC	1,24,031	Piya Saha	BJP	75,648	Shyamali Pradhan	CPI(M)	7,231	48,383
290	Mayureswar	Asit Kumar Mal	AITC	1,01,634	Piya Saha	BJP	80,882	Shyamali Pradhan	CPI(M)	13,052	20,752
Birbhum Lok Sabha constituency
284	Dubrajpur (SC)	Satabdi Roy	AITC	1,02,935	Debtanu Bhattacharya	BJP	84,655	Milton Rashid	INC	10,576	18,280
285	Suri	Satabdi Roy	AITC	1,06,922	Debtanu Bhattacharya	BJP	94,423	Milton Rashid	INC	14,672	12,499
289	Sainthia (SC)	Satabdi Roy	AITC	1,19,460	Debtanu Bhattacharya	BJP	84,223	Milton Rashid	INC	13,308	35,237
291	Rampurhat	Satabdi Roy	AITC	97,579	Debtanu Bhattacharya	BJP	90,618	Milton Rashid	INC	25,609	6,961
292	Hansan	Satabdi Roy	AITC	94,405	Debtanu Bhattacharya	BJP	55,447	Milton Rashid	INC	52,643	38,958
293	Nalhati	Satabdi Roy	AITC	87,340	Debtanu Bhattacharya	BJP	60,914	Milton Rashid	INC	52,276	26,426
294	Murarai	Satabdi Roy	AITC	1,06,331	Milton Rashid	INC	56,488	Debtanu Bhattacharya	BJP	47,481	49,843

=== Postal ballot wise leads ===
2024 Lok Sabha West Bengal Postal Ballot Wise Leads Map

Party		Leads in 2019	Leads in 2024	+/–
AITC+	Trinamool Congress	2	26	▲24
AITC+	Total	2	26	▲24
NDA	Bharatiya Janata Party	39	16	▼23
NDA	Total	39	16	▼23
INDIA	Indian National Congress	0	0	Steady
INDIA	Communist Party of India (Marxist)	1	0	▼1
INDIA	Total	1	0	▼1
Total		42		

== Region-Wise Results ==
Region	Total seats	Trinamool Congress		Bharatiya Janata Party		Indian National Congress		Communist Party of India (Marxist)		Others
East Bengal (Ganges Delta Region)	10	08	▲01	02	▼01	00	Steady	00	Steady	00
North Bengal	8	04	▲01	03	Steady	01	▼01	00	Steady	00
Northern Hills	4	01	▲01	03	▼01	00	Steady	00	Steady	00
West Bengal (Rarh Region)	10	08	▲05	02	▼05	00	Steady	00	Steady	00
South Bengal	10	08	▼01	02	▲01	00	Steady	00	Steady	00
Total	42	29	▲07	12	▼06	01	▼01	00	Steady	00

=== Vote-share ===
Region	Trinamool Congress	Bharatiya Janata Party	Indian National Congress	Communist Party of India (Marxist)
East Bengal (Ganges Delta Region)	54.5%	36.8%	0.53%	8.0%
North Bengal	39.1%	34.4%	19.5%	6.9%
Northern Hills	45.3%	50.6%	1.6%	2.3%
West Bengal (Rarh Region)	49.4%	41.6%	2.5%	6.2%
South Bengal	49.2%	42.1%	1.6%	6.9%
Total	45.7%	38.7%	4.6%	5.6%

== Post-election developments ==
- In June 2026, 20 Lok Sabha MPs of the Trinamool Congress (TMC) broke away from the party, formed a separate parliamentary group, and announced their merger with the Nationalist Citizens Party of India (NCPI), a registered political party based in Tripura.
- The group, led by Kakoli Ghosh Dastidar and Sudip Bandyopadhyay, submitted its claim to Lok Sabha Speaker Om Birla and extended support to the BJP-led National Democratic Alliance (NDA).
- The rebels argued that they constituted more than two-thirds of the TMC's Lok Sabha strength and were therefore protected under the merger provisions of the Tenth Schedule.

The Trinamool Congress MPs who joined the NCPI were:
Name of MP	Constituency	Party	Merged
Kakoli Ghosh Dastidar	Barasat	AITC	NCPI
Sudip Bandyopadhyay	Kolkata Uttar	AITC	NCPI
Satabdi Roy	Birbhum	AITC	NCPI
Saayoni Ghosh	Jadavpur	AITC	NCPI
Yusuf Pathan	Baharampur	AITC	NCPI
Deepak Adhikari	Ghatal	AITC	NCPI
June Malia	Medinipur	AITC	NCPI
Prasun Banerjee	Howrah	AITC	NCPI
Jagadish Chandra Barma	Cooch Behar (SC)	AITC	NCPI
Khalilur Rahaman	Jangipur	AITC	NCPI
Abu Taher Khan	Murshidabad	AITC	NCPI
Partha Bhowmick	Barrackpore	AITC	NCPI
Bapi Halder	Mathurapur (SC)	AITC	NCPI
Mala Roy	Kolkata Dakshin	AITC	NCPI
Rachana Banerjee	Hooghly	AITC	NCPI
Mitali Bag	Arambagh (SC)	AITC	NCPI
Kalipada Soren	Jhargram (ST)	AITC	NCPI
Arup Chakraborty	Bankura	AITC	NCPI
Sharmila Sarkar	Bardhaman Purba (SC)	AITC	NCPI
Asit Kumar Mal	Bolpur (SC)	AITC	NCPI

Following the merger, Kakoli Ghosh Dastidar was appointed president of the NCPI.

== See also ==
- Politics of West Bengal
- 2019 Indian general election in West Bengal
- 2021 West Bengal Legislative Assembly election
- 2026 West Bengal Legislative Assembly election
