= Nirbed Roy =

Indian politician from West Bengal

Member of the West Bengal Legislative Assembly
- In office 2001–2006
- Constituency: Tamluk

Personal details
- Party: All India Trinamool Congress
- Other political affiliations: Indian National Congress (before 2025)
- Spouse: Mala Roy
- Education: University of Calcutta
- Profession: Politician, retired employee

Nirbed Roy (also spelled Nirbed Ray) is an Indian politician from the state of West Bengal. He served as a Member of the Legislative Assembly (India) (MLA) representing the Tamluk constituency and was associated with both the Indian National Congress and later the All India Trinamool Congress (TMC). He is also known as the husband of MP and Kolkata Municipal Corporation chairperson Mala Roy.

== Early life and education ==
Nirbed Roy was born in West Bengal. He completed a Master of Arts degree in 1977 and earned an LL.B. degree in 1982 from the University of Calcutta.

== Career ==
=== Congress politics ===
Prior to joining the TMC, Roy was associated with the Indian National Congress and served in leadership positions within the West Bengal Pradesh Congress Committee.

=== Trinamool Congress ===
In April 2025, Roy joined the All India Trinamool Congress in the presence of senior party leaders. He has served as a vice-president of the party and previously represented the Tamluk constituency as an MLA during the 2001–2006 term.

== Personal life ==
Roy is married to Mala Roy, the Member of Parliament for Kolkata Dakshin and Chairperson of the Kolkata Municipal Corporation.

== Electoral performance ==
In the 2016 West Bengal Legislative Assembly election, Roy contested from the Tamluk constituency as a TMC candidate and won. His election affidavit listed his profession as a retired employee of the Asiatic Society and disclosed movable assets worth ₹1.4 crore.

== See also ==
- Mala Roy
- All India Trinamool Congress
- West Bengal Legislative Assembly
