= Umakanta Roy =

Indian politician

Umakanta Roy was an Indian politician, belonging to the Revolutionary Communist Party of India and a member of the West Bengal Legislative Assembly 1985-1987.

== 1985 by-election ==
After the death of the incumbent Hansan constituency legislator Trilochan Mal, Roy was elected to the West Bengal Legislative Assembly in a by-election held on 25 April 1985. Roy obtained 37,573 votes (51.55%) against 34,095 votes for the Indian National Congress candidate A. Mal and 1,216 votes for independent candidate B. Marjit.

== Later period ==
Roy did not contest the 1987 West Bengal Legislative Assembly election. In the 1991 West Bengal Legislative Assembly election Roy stood as a candidate of the RCPI splinter group (Gouranga Sit faction) in Hansan, against the official RCPI candidate Trilochan Das. Roy obtained 983 votes (1.09%).
