= Milton Rashid =

Indian politician and former Member of the West Bengal Legislative Assembly

Member of the West Bengal Legislative Assembly
- In office 19 May 2016 – 2 May 2021
- Preceded by: Asit Kumar Mal
- Succeeded by: Asok Kumar Chattopadhyay
- Constituency: Hansan

Personal details
- Party: Indian National Congress
- Occupation: Politician

Milton Rashid is an Indian politician who served as a Member of the West Bengal Legislative Assembly representing the Hansan Assembly constituency from 2016 to 2021. He was elected in the 2016 West Bengal Legislative Assembly election as a candidate of the Indian National Congress. He succeeded Asit Kumar Mal and was succeeded by Asok Kumar Chattopadhyay following the 2021 West Bengal Legislative Assembly election.

== Early life and family ==
Rashid was born in 1975 to a Bengali Muslim family in Birbhum district of West Bengal. He is the son of Abdur Rashid. Rashid is an advocate, having graduated with a Bachelor of Laws from TNB College in 2004 and Master of Arts degree in Environmental Science from the Rabindra Bharati University in 2013.

== Career ==
Rashid is a former president of the West Bengal State Congress “Minority Cell”, former district president of “INTUC” Birbhum, and a former General Secretary of the Students' Union at Rampurhat College. He contested in the 2016 West Bengal Legislative Assembly election where he ran as an Indian National Congress candidate for Hansan Assembly constituency, defeating former MLA Asit Kumar Mal. He contested again in the 2021 West Bengal Legislative Assembly election but was unsuccessful. Rashid also contested in the 2024 Indian general election but was unsuccessful.
