= 2022 West Bengal School Service Commission recruitment scam =

Ongoing education scam in India

West Bengal School Service Commission recruitment scam is an ongoing education SSC scam in West Bengal, India since 2022. The scam is being currently investigated jointly by Central Bureau of Investigation and Enforcement Directorate. The scam was revealed, following the arrest of Partha Chatterjee, a Trinamool Congress leader, who has served as the Minister of Education in the Mamata Banerjee's cabinet until his arrest on 23 July 2022.

Notice in compliance with the direction of Hon'ble Supreme Court of India, dated 25.07.2023 in Diary no. 28088 of 2023 and diary no. 28468 of 2023 towards publishing the details of 907 candidates in connection with 1st SLST,2016 for class XI-XII.

In compliance with the direction of Hon'ble Supreme Court of India, dated 25.07.2023 in Diary no. 28088 of 2023 and diary no. 28468 of 2023, the details of 907 candidates in connection with 1st State level Selection Test for the posts of Assistant Teachers (except Hill Region), for classes XI –XII, 2016 has been published in the website of West Bengal Central School Service Commission.

== Background ==
In November 2021, Calcutta High Court directed CBI to take charge of the investigation of the scam and find out the people who are accused in the scam. However, at that time, the Government of West Bengal went on to challenge the order before a division bench, which was rejected by the court.

Following the order of the court under the bench of Justice Abhijit Gangopadhyay, CBI went on to their investigation process starting from 2022, where they raided several places in West Bengal to proceed with the investigation. In May 2022, former TMC MLA and minister in the Mamata Banerjee's cabinet, Upendra Nath Biswas who has previously served as the CBI officer, investigating several scams, revealed about the SSC scam through his Facebook post.

On 23 July 2022, ED arrested TMC leader, who is MLA from Behala Paschim, Partha Chatterjee, who has served as the Minister of Education in Mamata Banerjee cabinet and known as a close aide to her, after multiple interrogations. Following his arrest, the house of his mistress, a small Ollywood actress named Arpita Mukherjee was raided by ED on 23 July 2022, where in her South-West Kolkata apartment, INR 21 crores in cash, along with jewelleries worth INR 50 lakhs and 70 lakhs respectively. She was immediately taken into custody by ED. However, Mukherjee claimed in front of media that Chatterjee was using her house for keeping the money and she doesn't knew about it. Following the next day, ED raided another apartment of Mukherjee, situated in Belghoria, in North Kolkata, where they recovered more 27.90 crore INR in cash, along with 6 kg of gold.

Following the arrest of Chatterjee, he was brought to ESI Hospital, located in Joka in South Kolkata, on the same day, for the medical test. But, he was admitted to SSKM Hospital, in Kolkata, as he was complaining of chest pain. But ED officers requested to the Bankshall Court for allowing to admit Chatterjee in the Command Hospital, instead of in SSKM. A petition also was filed in the court for taking Chatterjee to Bhubaneswar for treatment in AIIMS, Bhubaneswar, which was granted by the court.

On 10 August 2022, CBI arrested Shanti Prasad Sinha, who has been appointed as convenor of special advisory committee formed by Chatterjee for the appointments in SSC, along with Ashok Saha, who was the secretary of West Bengal State School Service Commission, after interrogation, in Kolkata.

On 15 September 2022, CBI arrested Kalyanmoy Gangopadhyay, who was the chairman of the WBBSE, following several interrogations.

On 19 September 2022, CBI arrested Subiresh Bhattacharya, who has also served previously as the West Bengal School Service Commission, and was serving as the Vice-Chancellor of University of North Bengal. He was reported to be not cooperating with the agency in order to proceed with further investigations.

On 11 October 2022, ED arrested another TMC MLA from Palashipara, Manik Bhattacharya, who was the present chairman of West Bengal SSC Committee.

Gradually, two local TMC youth leaders, Kuntal Ghosh and Shantanu Bandyopadhyay were also arrested in the case.

On 17 April 2023, after several interrogations, CBI arrested another TMC legislator Jiban Krishna Saha, who is MLA from Burwan, Murshidabad, who tried to run from his house and thrown his mobile phone in the pond.

On 28 April 2023, the Supreme Court directed to move the case hearings of the scam from the bench of Justice Abhijit Gangopadhyay to Justice Amrita Sinha after Justice Gangopadhyay discussed about the case in an interview he gave to the Bengali newschannel ABP Ananda, in which he declared his intention to prosecute Diamond Harbour MP, TMC general secretary & Mamata Banerjee's nephew Abhishek Banerjee (whose involvement was being alleged by the state BJP unit but no proof in this regard had been made public by investigative agencies till then) in this matter. CJI D. Y. Chandrachud took strong exception of Justice Gangopadhyay's interview and stated that "judges have no business granting interviews to the media on pending matters".

On 20 May 2023, Abhishek Banerjee was interrogated by ED in Kolkata.

On 30 May 2023, Sujay Krishna Bhadra, who is popularly known as 'Kalighater Kaku' was arrested after repeated interrogations done since January 2023.

On 28 June 2023, Bengali actress & president of TMC's student wing Saayoni Ghosh was summoned by ED in connection with the scam. However, she fled from her South Kolkata residence and no one had able to trace her.

On 30 June 2023, Saayoni Ghosh appeared before ED officials in the probe and also said that she will appear again if they want to interrogate again. On 5 July 2023, she was summoned again for interrogation.

== Reactions ==
On 28 July 2022, Chatterjee was suspended from Trinamool Congress, due to the allegations against him. He was also removed from the ministerial posts, which he was holding in Mamata Banerjee's cabinet. Senior spokesperson of TMC, former Member of Parliament Kunal Ghosh demanded action against Chatterjee, making the TMC leadership distance themselves from the scam.

Soon after the suspension of Chatterjee from the party, Bharatiya Janata Party, Communist Party of India (Marxist) and Indian National Congress leaders reacted to the decision. BJP leader Suvendu Adhikari criticized Banerjee and TMC for using government event for political purposes, and also claimed that Banerjee might be involved in the scam as well and she can't distance herself from the scam. CPM leader Bikash Ranjan Bhattacharya said that Banerjee is trying to make distance herself from the scam, but it's too late now, she would be caught soon. Congress leader Adhir Ranjan Chowdhury demanded removal of Chatterjee from the ministerial post and party posts he was holding during his arrest by ED, after interrogation.

Also, on 1 May 2024, while sudden in an interview to ABP Ananda, just before the 2024 General Election, former Rajya Sabha MP Kunal Ghosh alleged that party already knew that Chatterjee, being the Education Minister, was involved in the scandal and giving jobs with cash bribe even before the 2026 assembly polls.

== See also ==
- List of scandals in India
- Corruption in India
- Saradha Group financial scandal
- Vyapam scam
- The Lokpal Bill, 2011
- 2011 Indian anti-corruption movement
- Jan Lokpal Bill
- 2024 NEET controversy
