= Sharmila Sarkar =

Indian politician

Member of Parliament, Lok Sabha
- Incumbent
- Assumed office 4 June 2024
- Preceded by: Sunil Kumar Mondal
- Constituency: Bardhaman Purba

Personal details
- Born: 1 January 1979 (age 47) Katwa Purba Bardhaman, West Bengal
- Party: Nationalist Citizens Party of India (2026–present)
- Other political affiliations: Trinamool Congress (till 2026)
- Spouse: Dr Sudip Kumar Ghosh (m.28 January 2007)
- Children: 1 Daughter
- Parent(s): Surath Sarkar, Chhabi Sarkar
- Occupation: Doctor

Sharmila Sarkar (born 1 January 1979) is an Indian politician from West Bengal. She is a Member of Parliament from Bardhaman Purba Lok Sabha constituency in Bardhaman Purba district. She represented the All India Trinamool Congress.

== Early life and education ==
Sarkar hails from a poor family and was born on 1 January 1979 in Katwa village, Purba Bardhaman district in West Bengal. She is the daughter of Surath Sarkar and Chhabi Sarkar. She studied at Agradwip Union High School and passed madhyamik examinations in 1995. Later, she studied at Katwa College in 1997 before completing her MBBS and MD from R. G. Kar Medical College, affiliated with the West Bengal University of Health Sciences in 2008. Her Doctor of Medicine degree is in psychiatry. She started her career in Calcutta Medical College. She is a resident of Dumdum and also served at Calcutta National Medical College in Kolkata. She married Sudip Kumar Ghosh, also a former government medical doctor, and together they have a daughter. Both of them are into private practice. She declared assets worth Rs.5 crore in the affidavit to the Election Commission of India before the general election. She has no criminal cases against her.

== Political career ==
Sarkar was elected as a Member of Parliament for the first time in the 2024 Indian general election in West Bengal from Bardhaman Purba Lok Sabha Constituency representing the Trinamool Congress. She polled 730,302 votes and defeated her nearest rival and the Bharatiya Janata Party candidate, Ashim Kumar Sarkar, of the NDA alliance, by a margin of 160,572 votes. Two time MP, Sunil Kumar Mondal who was denied a ticket for the third time joined the Bharatiya Janata Party in April 2024.

=== 2026 Rebellion ===
In June 2026, almost immediately after the massive Trinamool Congress defeat, around 20 MPs of TMC including Yusuf Pathan, Saayoni Ghosh, Shatrughan Sinha, Bapi Halder, Mala Roy, Mitali Bag, Deepak Adhikari, Arup Chakraborty, Sharmila Sarkar, Satabdi Roy, Rachna Banerjee, Prasun Banerjee and others, allegedly declared rebellion from their Party, and presented their written wish to join Bhartiya Janata Party. This group was led by Kakoli Ghosh.

Later, on 14 June, 20 MPs, including Sarkar, signed a formal letter declaring their split from Trinamool Congress as to merge with the Nationalist Citizen Party of India (NCPI). They formally submitted the letter to Lok Sabha Speaker Om Birla.

The total strength of TMC in Lok Sabha had been 28, so that a number of 20 MPS made it eligible for splitting from the Party, as per the Indian Defection laws, so as to escape the anti-defection disqualification.
