= Kajal Sekh =

Indian politician

Member of the West Bengal Legislative Assembly
- Incumbent
- Assumed office 2026
- Preceded by: Ashok Kumar Chatterjee
- Constituency: Hansan

6th Sabhadhipati of Birbhum Zilla Parishad
- In office 2023–2026
- Preceded by: Bikash Roychoudhury

Personal details
- Born: Fayezul Haque
- Party: Democratic Trinamool Congress
- Profession: Politician

Fayezul Haque, better known as Kajal Sekh, is an Indian politician from West Bengal. He has served as the Sabhadhipati of Birbhum Zilla Parishad since 2023 and was elected as a member of the West Bengal Legislative Assembly from Hansan in 2026 as a candidate of the Democratic Trinamool Congress. 1

== Political career ==
Haque won the Hansan constituency seat in the 2026 West Bengal Legislative Assembly election as a candidate of the Trinamool Congress. He defeated Nikhil Banerjee of the Bharatiya Janata Party by a margin of 28,298 votes.
