= Debasree Chaudhuri =

Indian politician

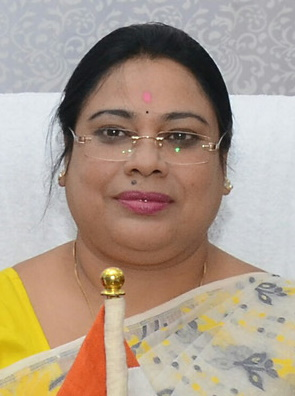

Union Minister of State for Woman and Child Development, Government of India
- In office 30 May 2019 – 7 July 2021
- Prime Minister: Narendra Modi
- Minister: Smriti Irani
- Preceded by: Virendra Kumar Khatik
- Succeeded by: Mahendra Munjapara

Member of Parliament, Lok Sabha
- In office 23 May 2019 – 4 June 2024
- Constituency: Raiganj
- Preceded by: Mohammed Salim
- Succeeded by: Kartick Paul

Personal details
- Born: 31 January 1971 (age 55) Balurghat, West Bengal, India
- Party: Bharatiya Janata Party
- Education: M.A. University of Burdwan
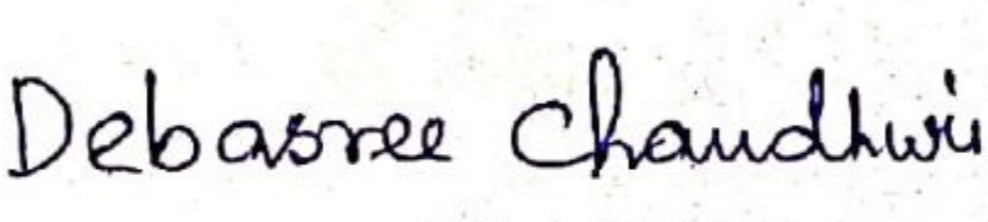
- Signature

Debasree Chaudhuri (born 31 January 1971) is an Indian politician who served as the Minister of State for Woman and Child Development in the Second Modi ministry from 2019 to 2021 in the Government of India. She was elected to the 17th Lok Sabha from Raiganj constituency in West Bengal in the 2019 Indian general election as a member of the Bharatiya Janata Party. She unsuccessfully contested 2024 Indian general election from Kolkata Dakshin.

== Early life ==
Chaudhuri was born in Balurghat to Debidas Chaudhuri and Ratna Chaudhuri. She completed her Master of Arts from the University of Burdwan.

== Political career ==
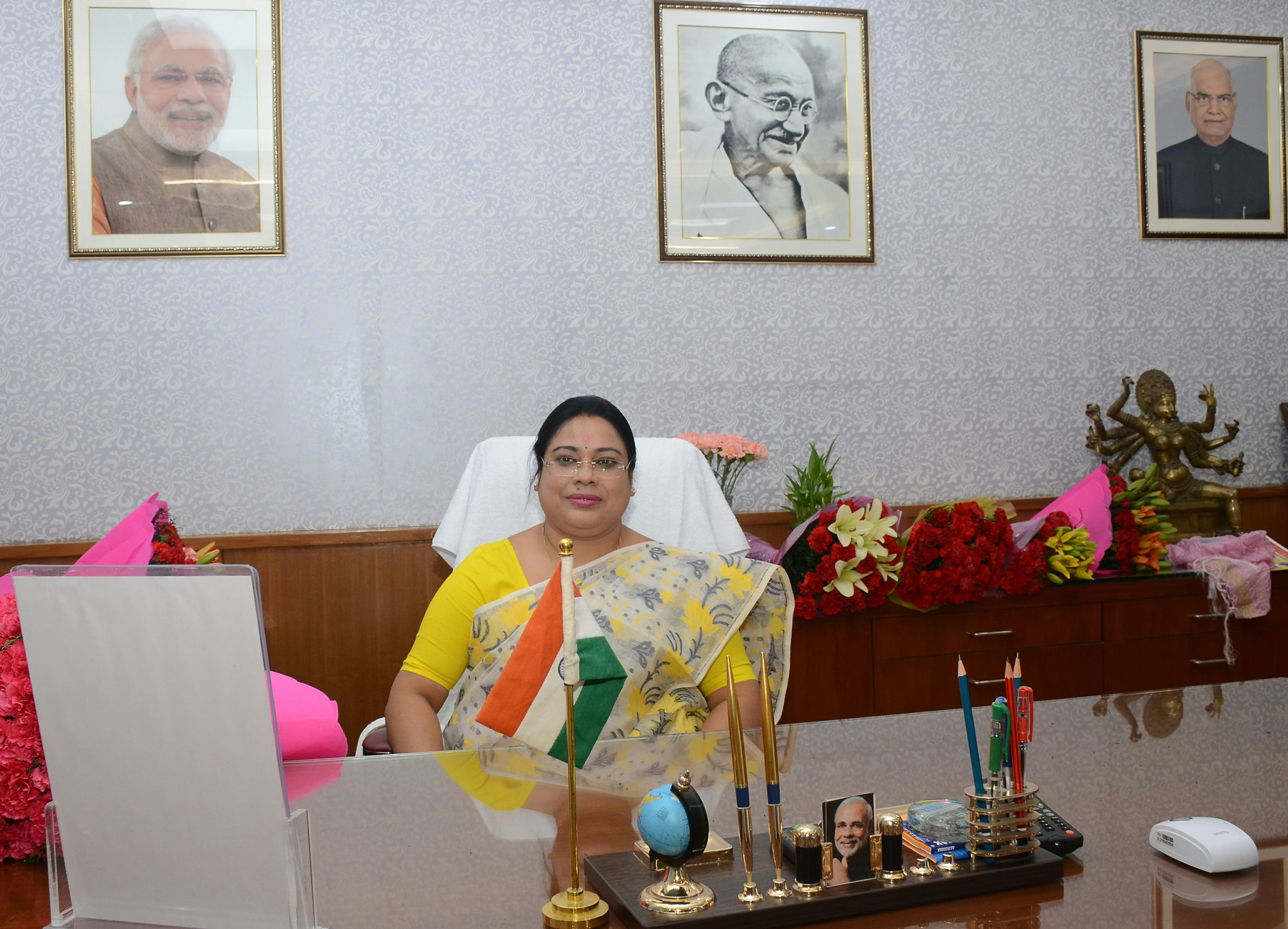
Chaudhuri taking charge as the Minister of State for Women and Child Development, in New Delhi on 31 May 2019.

On 16 December 2016, Chaudhuri was arrested along with Baisnabnagar MLA Swadhin Kumar Sarkar and other local BJP leaders at a protest condemning comments made by Maulauna Noor ur Rahman Barkati, the Shahi Imam of the Tipu Sultan Mosque in Kolkata. Debashree Chowdhury was previously the District Observer of BJP Kolkata South Suburban District till 2019.

In the 2019 Indian general election, Chaudhuri won from the Raiganj Lok Sabha constituency with 511652 votes. In May 2019, Chaudhuri became Minister of State for Women and Child Development.

In the 2024 Indian general election, Chaudhari ran for a second time from Kolkata Dakshin, however she lost to Mala Roy by 4.28 Lakhs votes.
