= Trilochan Mal =

Indian politician

Trilochan Mal was an Indian politician, belonging to the Revolutionary Communist Party of India (RCPI). He was a school teacher by profession. Mal was active in the peasants front of RCPI in Birbhum District. He was a leading figure of the 1959 food movement in Rampurhat. Mal was imprisoned multiple times.

Mal contested the Murarai seat, standing as an independent, in the 1952 West Bengal Legislative Assembly election. He finished in fourth place wit 2,654 votes (13.03%). In the 1957 West Bengal Legislative Assembly election he contested the seat reserved for Scheduled Castes in the Nalhati two-member constituency, again standing as an independent. He obtained 5,132 votes, the third largest vote count among the Scheduled Caste seat candidates. In the 1962 West Bengal Legislative Assembly election he stood as an independent in Nalhati, finishing in third place with 5,212 votes (22.48%).

Mal won the Hansan seat in the 1971 West Bengal Legislative Assembly election, standing as an RCPI candidate and obtaining 9,181 votes (44.20%). He subsequently lost the seat in the 1972 West Bengal Legislative Assembly election, finishing in second place with 12,542 votes (42.01%). Mal was elected to the assembly from Hansan in the 1977 elections (14,883 votes, 39.60%) and the 1982 election (34,663 votes, 53.10%). Mal died during the 1982-1987 legislative term. In 1985 a by-election was held for the Hansan seat, won by RCPI candidate Umakanta Roy.
