= Kaustuv Bagchi =

Indian politician (born 1991)

Member of the West Bengal Legislative Assembly
- Incumbent
- Assumed office 4 May 2026
- Preceded by: Raj Chakraborty
- Constituency: Barrackpur

Personal details
- Party: Bharatiya Janata Party (2024-Present)
- Other political affiliations: Indian National Congress (Unknown-2024)
- Education: University of Calcutta ( LLB); Kakatiya University (LLM)
- Profession: Politician

Kaustuv Bagchi (born 1991) is an Indian politician from West Bengal. He is a member of the West Bengal Legislative Assembly from the Barrackpur Assembly constituency in North 24 Parganas district representing the Bharatiya Janata Party.

== Early life and education ==
Bagchi is from Barrackpur, North 24 Parganas district, West Bengal. He is the son of Late Shri Kushal Bagchi. He completed his LLM at Kakatiya University in 2017. He and his wife are lawyers of Kolkata High Court. He declared assets worth more then ₹1 crore in his affidavit to the Election Commission of India.

== Career ==
Bagchi, a leader and spokesperson of the Indian Nationial Congress, resigned from the party in February 2024 and joined the Bharatiya Janata Party. He won the Barrackpur Assembly constituency in North 24 Parganas district representing the BJP in the 2026 West Bengal Legislative Assembly election. He polled 78,466 votes and defeated his nearest rival and sitting MLA, Raj Chakraborty of the All India Trinamool Congress by a margin of 15,822 votes.

== See also ==
- 2026 West Bengal Legislative Assembly election
- List of chief ministers of West Bengal
- West Bengal Legislative Assembly
- 18th West Bengal Assembly
