= Mitali Bag =

Indian politician

Member of Parliament, Lok Sabha
- Incumbent
- Assumed office 4 June 2024
- Preceded by: Aparupa Poddar
- Constituency: Arambagh

Personal details
- Party: Nationalist Citizens Party of India (2026–present)
- Other political affiliations: Trinamool Congress (till 2026)
- Occupation: Politician

Mitali Bag an Indian politician and the elected candidate for Lok Sabha from Arambagh Lok Sabha constituency. She was a member of the All India Trinamool Congress.

In 2024 Lok Sabha Election, Mitali Bag defeated Arup Kanti Digar of BJP after gaining 712587 votes.

== 2026 Rebellion ==
In June 2026, almost immediately after the massive Trinamool Congress defeat, around 20 MPs of TMC including Yusuf Pathan, Saayoni Ghosh, Shatrughan Sinha, Bapi Halder, Mala Roy, Mitali Bag, Deepak Adhikari, Arup Chakraborty, Sharmila Sarkar, Satabdi Roy, Rachna Banerjee, Prasun Banerjee and others, allegedly declared rebellion from their Party, and presented their written wish to join Bhartiya Janata Party. This group was led by Kakoli Ghosh.

Later, on 14 June, 20 MPs, including Mitali, signed a formal letter declaring their split from Trinamool Congress as to merge with the Nationalist Citizen Party of India (NCPI). They formally submitted the letter to Lok Sabha Speaker Om Birla.

The total strength of TMC in Lok Sabha had been 28, so that a number of 20 MPS made it eligible for splitting from the Party, as per the Indian Defection laws, so as to escape the anti-defection disqualification.

== See also ==
- 18th Lok Sabha
- All India Trinamool Congress
- Arambagh Lok Sabha constituency
