= Abhijit Gangopadhyay =

Indian former judge and politician (born 1962)

Justice (Retd.) Abhijit Gangopadhyay

Member of Parliament, Lok Sabha
- Incumbent
- Assumed office 4 June 2024
- Preceded by: Dibyendu Adhikari
- Constituency: Tamluk

Judge of the Calcutta High Court
- In office 30 July 2020 – 5 March 2024

Additional Judge at Calcutta High Court
- In office May 2018 – July 2020

Personal details
- Born: 20 August 1962 (age 64) Kolkata, West Bengal, India
- Party: Bharatiya Janata Party
- Education: Hazra Law College (LLB)

Abhijit Gangopadhyay (born 20 August 1962) is an Indian politician and former judge of the Calcutta High Court.

== Early life and education ==
Gangopadhyay was born to Late Gobindo Ganguly and Late Shovana Ganguly in 1962. He did his schooling at Mitra Institution (Main) in Kolkata, and passed out from the school in 1979. He studied law at Hazra Law College.

During college life, Gangopadhyay acted in Bengali theatre. He was a member of a theatre group "Amitra Chanda". In 1986, he last acted in a play.

== Legal career ==
Gangopadhyay started his career as a West Bengal Civil Service (WBCS) officer. He was posted at North Dinajpur. Thereafter, he left the job and practised as a State Advocate in the Calcutta High Court before being elevated to the bench as an additional judge on 2 May 2018. He became a permanent judge on 30 July 2020. Gangopadhyay resigned from his post on 5 March 2024.

=== Notable judgements ===
Since November 2021, Justice Gangopadhyay gave a series of directions of inquiry to the Central Bureau of Investigation (CBI) against the West Bengal School Service Commission (WBSSC) for the alleged anomalies in recruitment process. He passed a number of orders against the officials of the School Service Commission, which lead to some political issues in West Bengal as well as Calcutta High Court. Gangopadhyay wrote a letter seeking intervention of the Chief Justice of India regarding the action of Division Bench in the cases of alleged irregularities of School Service Commission.

On 13 April 2022 the Bar Association, Calcutta High Court brought out a resolution to boycott the Court of Gangopadhyay. Trinamool Congress law cell protested outside his courtroom and the then Governor Jagdeep Dhankhar wrote letter to the Chief Minister of West Bengal on this issue. On 18 May Gangopadhyay directed former Education Minister Partha Chatterjee to appear before the CBI for the investigation of alleged teachers recruitment scam. On 17 May 2022, in another case he asked Paresh Chandra Adhikary, Minister of State for Department of School Education to be present before CBI over his connection in alleged illegal appointment of his daughter Ankita Adhikary. He also urged the Chief Minister and Hon'ble Governor to remove Adhikary from the post of minister.

In September 2022, Justice Gangopadhyay instructed West Bengal School Service Commission (WBSSC) to replace illegally appointed school teachers with eligible waiting list candidates. In July 2023, he instructed West Bengal School Service Commission to publish illegally appointed 907 school teachers of XI-XII.

In December 2023, the Calcutta High Court Bar Association boycotted Mr. Gangopadhyay after he ordered the arrest of a lawyer in his courtroom for contempt. Although the order was later withdrawn, the association demanded that all judicial work be withdrawn from Mr. Gangopadhyay until he apologised to the advocate and the bar. After staying away from court for two days, Mr. Gangopadhyay addressed the bar association members with apologises and then the boycott was lifted by lawyers. This marked the first instance in Calcutta High Court where a sitting judge had to apologise to bar association members and lawyers.

== Political career ==
Gangopadhyay resigned his judicial position on 5 March 2024 and started his political journey within 2 days as a member of the Bharatiya Janata Party. He officially joined on 7 March 2024 into the party by BJP leaders Suvendu Adhikari and Sukanta Majumdar ahead of the 2024 Indian general election. He was subsequently contested for the Lok Sabha Election 2024 from Tamluk Lok Sabha constituency and became the Member of Parliament.

== Controversy ==
On 15 May 2024 during the campaign of Lok Sabha Election Gangopadhyay made derogatory remarks against Mamata Banerjee, former Chief Minister of West Bengal and the Election Commission of India censured him and imposed a campaigning bar on him for 24 hours due to the alleged low-level personal attack.
