= Uttam Barik =

Indian politician

Uttam Barik (born 1975) is an Indian politician from West Bengal. He is a member of the West Bengal Legislative Assembly from Patashpur Assembly constituency in Purba Medinipur district. He won the 2021 West Bengal Legislative Assembly election representing the All India Trinamool Congress party.

== Early life and education ==
Barik is from Patashpur, Purba Medinipur district, West Bengal. He is the son of late Birendra Barik. He studied Class 12 at Contai PK College and passed the examinations conducted by West Bengal Council of Higher Secondary Education in 1993. He runs his own business.

== Career ==
Barik won from Patashpur Assembly constituency representing the All India Trinamool Congress in the 2021 West Bengal Legislative Assembly election. He polled 105,299 votes and defeated his nearest rival, Ambujaksha Mahanti of the Bharatiya Janata Party, by a margin of 9,994 votes.
