= Prasun Banerjee =

Indian footballer and politician

Prasun Banerjee প্রসূন ব্যানার্জী

Member of Parliament, Lok Sabha
- Incumbent
- Assumed office June 2013
- Preceded by: Ambica Banerjee
- Constituency: Howrah

Personal details
- Party: Nationalist Citizens Party of India (2026–present)
- Other political affiliations: Trinamool Congress (till 2026)
- Education: University of Calcutta (BSc)
- Profession: Sportsperson, Politician
Association football career
- Date of birth: 6 April 1955 (age 71)
- Place of birth: Kolkata, West Bengal, India
- Positions: Central midfielder; central defensive midfielder; left-half
International career
Years	Team	Apps	(Gls)
1974–1985	India	49	(3)

Prasun Banerjee is an Indian former professional footballer and politician who is serving as an MP in the Lok Sabha from Howrah. He is an Arjuna Award winner (1979). Younger brother of the Pradip Kumar Banerjee, Prasun had also captained the India national football team in international tournaments.

== Early life ==
Prasun is the younger brother of India's player of the 20th century and former national coach, Pradip Kumar Banerjee. He is a graduate of the University of Calcutta.

== Career ==
=== Football ===
He was vice-captain of the India U-20 team that clinched 1974 AFC Youth Championship title in Thailand.

Banerjee began his club football career with Calcutta Football League club Kidderpore. He also played for Aryans. He was included in the All Time Best-XI team of Mohun Bagan as a central defensive midfielder. He was only the second Indian to play for Asian All-star XI. He also played two matches against Brazil for Asian All-star XI and played against Zico, Eder, Falcao, Socretes and others. He was included in the Limca book of record for representing India in 100 football matches.

=== Coaching ===
Prasun has also coached Mohun Bagan for two months in the 1990–91 season.

=== Politics ===
In 2013, he won the bypoll to the Howrah Sadar parliamentary constituency on a Trinamool Congress ticket thus becoming the first professional footballer to be a Member of Parliament, India (Lok Sabha). He won the seat defeating his adversary, Left Front's Sridip Bhattacharya, by more than 27,000 votes. He was re-elected to the 16th Lok Sabha in 2014.

== Controversy ==
In 2015, Banerjee was charged for slapping a Kolkata traffic constable. The constable, identified as Taragati Biswas, had reportedly stopped Banerjee's vehicle while it violated the 'no U-turn' rule.

=== 2026 Rebellion ===
In June 2026, almost immediately after the massive Trinamool Congress defeat, around 20 MPs of TMC including Yusuf Pathan, Saayoni Ghosh, Bapi Halder, Mala Roy, Mitali Bag, Deepak Adhikari, Arup Chakraborty, Sharmila Sarkar, Satabdi Roy, Rachna Banerjee, Prasun Banerjee and others, allegedly declared rebellion from their Party, and presented their written wish to join Bhartiya Janata Party. This group was led by Kakoli Ghosh.

Later, on 14 June, 20 MPs, including Prasun, signed a formal letter declaring their split from Trinamool Congress as to merge with the Nationalist Citizen Party of India (NCPI). They formally submitted the letter to Lok Sabha Speaker Om Birla.

The total strength of TMC in Lok Sabha had been 28, so that a number of 20 MPS made it eligible for splitting from the Party, as per the Indian Defection laws, so as to escape the anti-defection disqualification.

== Career statistics ==
=== India national team ===
Debut: 26 July 1974 vs Malaysia, in Merdeka Cup at Kuala Lumpur (Prasun Banerjee came in as a substitute for Gautam Sarkar).
No of Matches Played – 49
No of Matches played as a captain – 5
Goals Scored – 3

=== International tournaments ===
Asian Games – 1974, 1978, 1982.
Merdeka Cup (Kuala Lumpur) – 1974, 1981, 1982.
Pre Olympics – 1980 (Captain).
Nehru Cup – 1982.
Kings Cup (Bangkok) – 1977, 1981.
Presidents Cup (Seoul) – 1982.
Aga Khan Gold Cup (Dhaka) – 1977.

== Other Achievements ==
Prasun Banerjee was the Joint Captain of the Indian Youth Team along with Sabbir Ali which became Joint Champions with Iran in Asian Youth Soccer Tournament at Bangkok.

=== Bengal ===
Santosh Trophy – 1974, 1975, 1976, 1977, 1978, 1979 (Captain), 1982.
Goals Scored – 3
Championships Won – 1975, 1976, 1977, 1978, 1979 (Captain) and 1982 (Joint) – 6 times

=== Clubs ===
- Mohun Bagan – 1974, 1975, 1976, 1977, 1978 (Captain), 1979, 1980, 1982, 1983.

Goals Scored – 24 goals (CFL – 14, Bordoloi Trophy – 4, IFA Shield – 1, Durand Cup – 1, Rovers Cup – 1, Federation Cup −2, Darjeeling Gold Cup – 1).

Trophies Won -

Calcutta Football League (4) – 1976, 1978, 1979, 1983.
IFA Shield (5) – 1976 (Joint), 1977, 1978 (Joint), 1979, 1982.
Durand Cup (5) – 1974, 1977, 1979, 1980, 1982 (Joint).
Rovers Cup (2) – 1976, 1977.
Federation Cup (3) – 1978 (Joint), 1980 (Joint), 1982.
Bordoloi Trophy (4) – 1974, 1975, 1976, 1977.
Darjeeling Gold Cup (4) – 1975, 1976 (Joint), 1979, 1982.
Nagjee Trophy (1) – 1978.

Total – 28.

- Mohammedan Sporting – 1981, 1984, 1985

Goals Scored – 4 (CFL – 1, Federation Cup – 2, Sanjay Gandhi Gold Cup – 1).

Trophies Won -

Calcutta Football League – 1981.
Federation Cup – 1984.
Sanjay Gandhi Gold Cup – 1981.
Stafford Cup – 1981 (Joint).
Nizam Gold Cup – 1984.
Nagjee Trophy – 1984.
Rovers Cup – 1984.
Darjeeling Gold Cup – 1984.
Bordoloi Trophy – 1985

Total – 9

== Honours ==
India

- King's Cup third place: 1977

India U20

- AFC Asian U-19 Championship: 1974

Individual

- Arjuna Award: 1979
- Shaan-e-Mohammedan: 2016
