= Arup Chakraborty =

American engineer

Arup K. Chakraborty
- Born: November 26, 1961 (age 64)
- Citizenship: United States
- Education: Indian Institute of Technology Kanpur (Bachelor of Technology); University of Delaware (Ph.D.); University of Minnesota (Postdoctoral Fellowship)
- Spouse: Sharmila Chatterjee
- Children: 1
- Awards: 2006 NIH Director's Pioneer Award; 2016 National Academy of Sciences; 2018 Guggenheim Fellowships
- Scientific career
- Notable students: Jason Locasale

Arup K. Chakraborty is an American engineer, focusing in biophysics, computational modeling and infectious disease, currently the Robert T. Haslam Professor at Massachusetts Institute of Technology and formerly the Warren and Katherine Schlinger Distinguished Professor at University of California, Berkeley.
