= Barrackpur Assembly constituency =

Barrackpur
- Constituency No. 108 for the West Bengal Legislative Assembly
- Interactive Map Outlining Barrackpur Assembly Constituency

Constituency details
- Country: India
- Region: East India
- State: West Bengal
- District: North 24 Parganas
- Lok Sabha constituency: Barrackpur
- Established: 2011
- Total electors: 168,641
- Reservation: None

Member of Legislative Assembly
- 18th West Bengal Legislative Assembly
- Incumbent Kaustuv Bagchi
- Party: BJP
- Alliance: NDA
- Elected year: 2026

Party-wise wins in Barrackpur Assembly constituency
1. All India Trinamool Congress (3) (75.0%)
2. Bharatiya Janata Party (1) (25.0%)

Barrackpur Assembly constituency is an assembly constituency in North 24 Parganas district in the Indian state of West Bengal.

== Overview ==
As per orders of the Delimitation Commission, No. 108 Barrackpur Assembly constituency is composed of the following: Barrackpore municipality and Titagarh municipality.

Barrackpur Assembly constituency is part of No. 15 Barrackpur Lok Sabha constituency.

== Members of the Legislative Assembly ==
Election	Member	Party
2011	Shilbhadra Dutta	Trinamool Congress
2016	Shilbhadra Dutta	Trinamool Congress
2021	Raj Chakraborty	Trinamool Congress
2026	Kaustuv Bagchi	Bharatiya Janata Party

== Election results ==
=== 2026 ===
2026 West Bengal Legislative Assembly election: Barrackpur
Party	Candidate	Votes	%	±%
BJP	Kaustuv Bagchi	78,466	50.65	▲10.4
AITC	Raj Chakraborty	62,644	40.44	▼6.03
CPI(M)	Suman Ranjan Bandyopadhyay	10,197	6.58	▼4.31
NOTA	None of the above	1,197	0.77	▼0.53
Majority		15,822	10.21	▲3.99
Turnout		154,918	90.48	▲21.64
BJP gain from AITC		Swing		

=== 2021 ===
2021 West Bengal Legislative Assembly election: Barrackpur
Party	Candidate	Votes	%	±%
AITC	Raj Chakraborty	68,887	46.47	▲6.24
BJP	Chandramani Shukla	59,665	40.25	▲20.02
CPI(M)	Debasish Bhowmick	16,145	10.89	▼24.27
NOTA	None of the above	1,930	1.3	
Majority		9,222	6.22	
Turnout		148,249	68.84	
AITC hold		Swing		

=== 2016 ===
2016 West Bengal Legislative Assembly election: Barrackpur
Party	Candidate	Votes	%	±%
AITC	Shilbhadra Dutta	58,109	40.23	▼19.79
CPI(M)	Debasish Bhowmick	50,790	35.16	▲2.41
BJP	Amitava Roy	29,227	20.23	▲16.43
NOTA	None of the above	2,733	1.83	N/A
BSP	Tapas Sarkar	1,384	0.96	▼0.43
Majority		7,319	5.07	▼22.2
Turnout		1,44,450	71.78	▼6.08
AITC hold		Swing		

=== 2011 ===
In the 2011 election, Silbhadra Dutta of Trinamool Congress defeated his nearest rival Madhusudan Samanta of CPI(M).

2011 West Bengal Legislative Assembly election: Barrackpur
Party	Candidate	Votes	%	±%
AITC	Shilbhadra Dutta	79,515	60.02	
CPI(M)	Madhusudan Samanta	43,392	32.75	
BJP	Shambhu Nath Gupta	5,040	3.80	
BSP	Tapas Sarkar	1,843	1.39	
IND	Umasankar Biswakarma	1,434	1.08	
Majority		36,123	27.27	
Turnout		1,32,558	77.86	
AITC win (new seat)				
