= Kartick Chandra Paul =

Indian politician

Member of Parliament, Lok Sabha
- Incumbent
- Assumed office 4 June 2024
- Preceded by: Debasree Chaudhuri
- Constituency: Raiganj

Personal details
- Party: Bharatiya Janata Party
- Other political affiliations: All India Trinamool Congress; Indian National Congress

Kartick Chandra Paul is an Indian politician and social worker. He is serving as a Member of Parliament, Lok Sabha from Raiganj. He is a member of the Bharatiya Janata Party. Kartick Paul won by 68,197 votes over his nearest All India Trinamool Congress rival, Krishna Kalyani, from the Raiganj Lok Sabha seat in the 2024 Indian general election.

He is associated with Kaliaganj's Bharat Sebashram Sangha, Baira Kalibari, Mahendraganj Natmandir Committee, and Loknath Mandir Committee as a member.

== See also ==
- 18th Lok Sabha
