= Bapi Halder =

Indian politician

Member of Parliament, Lok Sabha
- Incumbent
- Assumed office 2024
- Preceded by: Choudhury Mohan Jatua
- Constituency: Mathurapur

Personal details
- Party: Nationalist Citizens Party of India (2026–present)
- Other political affiliations: Trinamool Congress (till 2026)
- Occupation: Politician

Bapi Halder is an Indian politician and the Member of Parliament, Lok Sabha from Mathurapur Lok Sabha constituency. He is a member of the Nationalist Citizens Party of India. He formerly represented Trinamool Congress.

== 2026 Rebellion ==
In June 2026, almost immediately after the massive Trinamool Congress defeat, around 20 MPs of TMC including Yusuf Pathan, Saayoni Ghosh, Shatrughan Sinha, Halder, Mala Roy, Mitali Bag, Deepak Adhikari, Arup Chakraborty, Sharmila Sarkar, Satabdi Roy, Rachna Banerjee, Prasun Banerjee and others, allegedly declared rebellion from their Party, and presented their written wish to join Bhartiya Janata Party. This group was led by Kakoli Ghosh.

Later, on 14 June 20 MPs, including Halder, signed a formal letter declaring their split from Trinamool Congress as to merge with the Nationalist Citizen Party of India (NCPI). They formally submitted the letter to Lok Sabha Speaker Om Birla.

The total strength of TMC in Lok Sabha had been 28, so that a number of 20 MPS made it eligible for splitting from the Party, as per the Indian Defection laws, so as to escape the anti-defection disqualification.

== See also ==
- 18th Lok Sabha
- All India Trinamool Congress
- Mathurapur Lok Sabha constituency
