= Silbhadra Dutta =

Indian politician

Silbhadra Dutta (born 1959) is an Indian politician from West Bengal. He is a former member of the West Bengal Legislative Assembly from Barrackpore Assembly constituency in North 24 Parganas district. He won the 2016 West Bengal Legislative Assembly election representing the All India Trinamool Congress.

== Early life and education ==
Dutta is from Barrackpore, North 24 Parganas district, West Bengal. He is the son of late Bhupendra Lal Dutta. He completed his master's degree in commerce at University of Calcutta in 1983. He is an advocate and his wife works as an assistant teacher in West Bengal government sponsored school.

== Career ==
Dutta was elected as an MLA for the first time on the All India Trinamool Congress ticket from Barrackpore Assembly constituency in the 2011 West Bengal Legislative Assembly election. He retained the seat for Trinamool in the 2016 Assembly election. In 2016, he polled 58,109 votes and defeated his nearest rival, Debasish Bhowmick of the Communist Party of India (Marxist), by a margin of 7,319 votes. In 1996, he contested on an Indian National Congress ticket and lost from Baranagar Assembly constituency.

In December 2020, he joined to the Bharatiya Janata Party. But, he lost the 2021 West Bengal Legislative Assembly election from Khardaha Assembly constituency on a BJP ticket to Kajal Sinha of the Trinamool Congress by a margin of 28,140 votes. In the 2024 Indian general election in West Bengal, he contested as an NDA alliance candidate and lost from the Dum Dum Lok Sabha constituency to Saugata Roy of the All India Trinamool Congress, by a margin of 70,660 votes.
