= Arup Chakraborty (politician) =

Indian politician

Member of Parliament, Lok Sabha
- Incumbent
- Assumed office 4 June 2024
- Preceded by: Subhash Sarkar
- Constituency: Bankura
- Majority: 32,778

Member of the West Bengal Legislative Assembly
- In office 6 May 2021 – 4 June 2024
- Preceded by: Samir Chakraborty
- Succeeded by: Falguni Singhababu
- Constituency: Taldangra, Bankura
- Majority: 12,377

Personal details
- Born: 5 August 1956 (age 70) Bankura, West Bengal, India
- Party: Nationalist Citizens Party of India (2026–present)
- Other political affiliations: Trinamool Congress (till 2026)
- Education: B.A., L.L.B
- Alma mater: Ranchi University (1979)
- Profession: Advocate

Arup Chakraborty (born 5 August 1956) is an Indian politician from West Bengal. A member of Trinamool Congress, he had served as member of West Bengal Legislative Assembly from Taldangra constituency in Bankura from 2021 to 2024. In 2024 General Elections, He was elected as Member of Parliament, Lok Sabha for Bankura Constituency, by defeating BJP's ex - union minister of state Subhas Sarkar.

== Birth and education ==
Chakraborty was born in Mejia, Bankura on 5 August 1956. He holds B.A. & L.L.B from Ranchi University in 1979.

== Career ==
He is the district party president for TMC in Bankura. He was elected as vice president of Bankura Zila Parishad in 2013. He was known for his controversial comments, some of which drew criticism.

In 2024, he became an MP from Bankura Lok Sabha seat.

=== 2026 Rebellion ===
In June 2026, almost immediately after the massive Trinamool Congress defeat, around 20 MPs of TMC including Yusuf Pathan, Saayoni Ghosh, Shatrughan Sinha, Bapi Halder, Mala Roy, Mitali Bag, Deepak Adhikari, Arup Chakraborty, Sharmila Sarkar, Satabdi Roy, Rachna Banerjee, Prasun Banerjee and others, allegedly declared rebellion from their Party, and presented their written wish to join Bhartiya Janata Party. This group was led by Kakoli Ghosh.

Later, on 14 June, 20 MPs, including Chakraborty, signed a formal letter declaring their split from Trinamool Congress as to merge with the Nationalist Citizen Party of India (NCPI). They formally submitted the letter to Lok Sabha Speaker Om Birla.

The total strength of TMC in Lok Sabha had been 28, so that a number of 20 MPS made it eligible for splitting from the Party, as per the Indian Defection laws, so as to escape the anti-defection disqualification.
