= Asit Kumar Mal =

Indian politician

Member of Parliament, Lok Sabha
- Incumbent
- Assumed office 23 May 2019
- Preceded by: Anupam Hazra
- Constituency: Bolpur, West Bengal

Member of the West Bengal Legislative Assembly
- In office 10 May 1987 – 20 May 2016
- Preceded by: Trilochon Das
- Succeeded by: Milton Rasid
- Constituency: Hansan

Personal details
- Born: 11 July 1955 (age 71) Margram, Rampurhat, Birbhum, India
- Party: Nationalist Citizens Party of India (2026–present)
- Other political affiliations: Indian National Congress, Trinamool Congress (till 2026)
- Occupation: Politician

Asit Kumar Mal is an Indian politician. He was elected to the Lok Sabha, lower house of the Parliament of India from Bolpur, West Bengal in the 2019 Indian general election as a member of the Trinamool Congress.
