= Hansan Assembly constituency =

Hansan
- Constituency No. 292 for the West Bengal Legislative Assembly
- Interactive Map Outlining Hansan Assembly Constituency

Constituency details
- Country: India
- Region: East India
- State: West Bengal
- District: Birbhum
- Lok Sabha constituency: Birbhum
- Established: 1962
- Total electors: 181,166
- Reservation: None

Member of Legislative Assembly
- 18th West Bengal Legislative Assembly
- Incumbent Fayezul Haque (Kajal Sk)
- Party: Democratic Trinamool Congress
- Elected year: 2026

Hansan Assembly constituency is an assembly constituency in Birbhum district in the Indian state of West Bengal.

== Overview ==
As per orders of the Delimitation Commission, No. 292 Hansan Assembly constituency is composed of the following: Rampurhat II and Nalhati II CD Blocks.

Hansan Assembly constituency is part of No. 42 Birbhum (Lok Sabha constituency).

== Members of the Legislative Assembly ==
Year	Name	Party
1967	S. Prasad	Indian National Congress
1969	Mrityunjoy Mandal	All India Forward Bloc
1971	Trilochan Mal	Revolutionary Communist Party of India
1972	Dhanapati Mal	Indian National Congress
1977	Trilochan Mal	Revolutionary Communist Party of India
1982	Trilochan Mal	Revolutionary Communist Party of India
1987	Asit Kumar Mal	Indian National Congress
1991	Trilochan Das	Revolutionary Communist Party of India (Rasik Bhatt)
1996	Asit Kumar Mal	Indian National Congress
2001	Asit Kumar Mal	Indian National Congress
2006	Asit Kumar Mal	Indian National Congress
2011	Asit Kumar Mal	Indian National Congress
2016	Milton Rashid	Indian National Congress
2021	Asok Kumar Chattopadhyay	All India Trinamool Congress
2026	Fayezul Haque	All India Trinamool Congress

== Election results ==
=== 2026 ===
Detailed Results at: https://results.eci.gov.in/ResultAcGenMay2026/candidateswise-S25292.htm

2026 West Bengal Legislative Assembly election: Hansan
Party	Candidate	Votes	%	±%
AITC	Fayezul Haque	103,223	45.56	▼5.86
BJP	Nikhil Banerjee	74,925	33.07	▲5.68
CPI(M)	Kamal Hasan	22,111	9.76	
INC	Milton Rashid	20,256	8.94	▼9.96
NOTA	None of the above	1,153	0.51	▼0.64
Majority		28,298	12.49	▼11.54
Turnout		226,555	95.33	▲10.45
AITC hold		Swing		

=== 2021 ===
2021 West Bengal Legislative Assembly election: Hansan
Party	Candidate	Votes	%	±%
AITC	Asok Kumar Chattopadhyay	108,289	51.42	
BJP	Nikhil Banerjee	57,676	27.39	
INC	Milton Rashid	39,815	18.90	
NOTA	None of the above	2,420	1.15	
Majority		50,613	24.03	
Turnout		210,606	84.88	
AITC gain from INC		Swing		

=== 2016 ===
In the 2016 election, Milton Rashid of Congress defeated his nearest rival Asit Kumar Mal of Trinamool Congress.

West Bengal assembly elections, 2016: Hansan
Party	Candidate	Votes	%	±%
INC	Milton Rashid	92,619	49.94	+3.21
AITC	Asit Kumar Mal	76,465	41.23	
BJP	Ruparani Mondal	7,662	4.13	+1.98
NOTA	None of the above	2,400	1.29	
BSP	Prabir Mukhopadhyay	1,584	0.85	
WPI	Bikash Let	1,119	0.60	
SP	Ali Tanser	1,047	0.56	
CPI(ML)L	Manik Mal	1,041	0.56	
SUCI(C)	Amal Mondal	785	0.42	
RCPI	Kamal Hasan	751	0.40	−29.48
Majority		16,154	8.71	
Turnout		185,473	84.42	−2.25
INC hold		Swing		

=== 2011 ===
In the 2011 election, Asit Kumar Mal of Congress defeated his nearest rival Kamal Hasan of RCPI.

West Bengal assembly elections, 2011: Hansan
Party	Candidate	Votes	%	±%
INC	Asit Kumar Mal	73,370	46.73	−3.17
RCPI	Kamal Hasan	46,918	29.88	−13.01
Independent	Md. Rafiuddin	27,461	17.49	
BJP	Ruparani Mondal	3,373	2.15	
SUCI(C)	Amal Kumar Mondal	2,503		
BSP	Radheshyam Singh	1,265		
JP	Jiyar Ali	1,081		
Independent	Azizul Hoque	1,050		
Turnout		157,021	86.67	
INC hold		Swing	+9.84	

=== 2006 ===
From 1996 to 2006, Asit Kumar Mal of Congress was elected from the Hansan (SC) assembly constituency. He defeated Khagendranath Mal of CPI(M) in 2006, Mihir Bain of RCPI(R) in 2001 and 1996. Contests in most years were multi cornered but only winners and runners are being mentioned. Trilochan Das of RCPI (RB) defeated Asit Kumar Mal of Congress in 1991. Asit Kumar Mal of Congress defeated Trilochan Das, Independent in 1987. Trilochan Mal, Independent/RCPI, defeated Asit Kumar Mal Congress/Independent in 1982 and 1977.

=== 1972 ===
Dhanapati Mal of Congress won in 1972. Trilochan Mal of RCPI won in 1971. Mrityunjoy Mandal of Forward Bloc won in 1969. S.Prasad of Congress won in 1967. Prior to that the Hansan seat was not there.
