= Mala Roy =

Indian politician

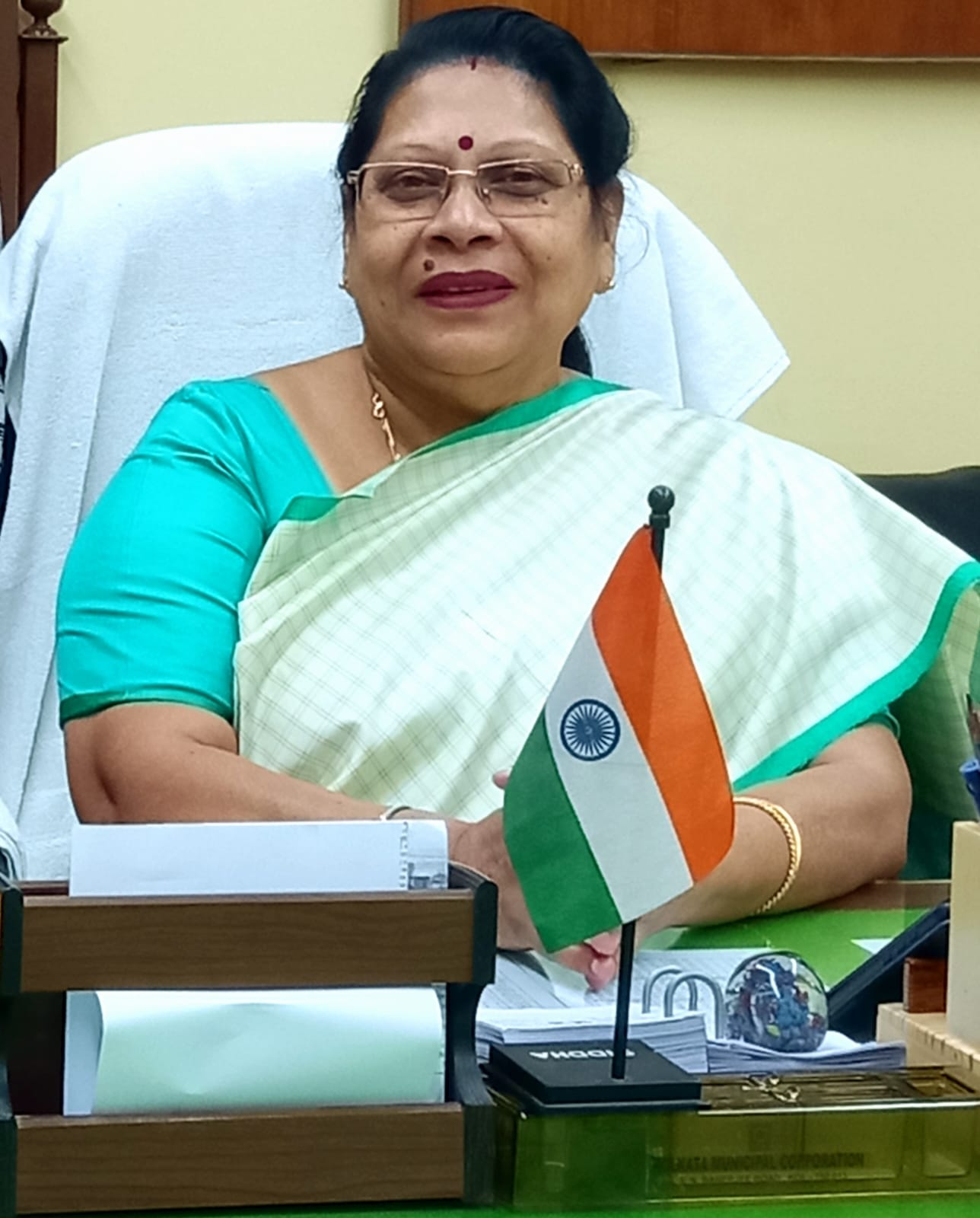
- Roy in 2021

Member of Parliament, Lok Sabha
- Incumbent
- Assumed office 23 May 2019
- Preceded by: Subrata Bakshi
- Constituency: Kolkata South

Positions in Kolkata Municipal Corporation
- 2015–present: Chairperson of Kolkata Municipal Corporation
- 2000–2005: Member of Mayor-in-Council (Solid Waste Management)
- 1995–present: Councillor from Ward No. 88

Personal details
- Born: 19 November 1957 (age 68) Kolkata, West Bengal, India
- Party: Nationalist Citizens Party of India (2026–present)
- Other political affiliations: Indian National Congress (1995–1998, 2010–2015); Nationalist Congress Party (2005–2010); Trinamool Congress (1998–2005, 2015–2026)
- Spouse: Nirbed Roy
- Children: 2

Mala Roy (née Sarkar; born 19 November 1957) is an Indian politician who has been a Member of Lok Sabha for Kolkata Dakshin since 2019. She is a member of the Nationalist Citizens Party of India, formerly of the All India Trinamool Congress party. She has been the Chairperson of Kolkata Municipal Corporation since 2015.

== Personal life ==
Roy graduated from Vidyasagar College for Women affiliated to Calcutta University in 1976. She is married to Nirbed Ray, who is the vice president and a former MLA of the Trinamool Congress party.

== Political career ==
In 1995, Roy was elected to the Kolkata Municipal Corporation as a councillor from ward no.88. She contested as a candidate of Indian National Congress party and defeated her nearest rival by a margin of 576 votes. In 2000, she contested as a candidate of Trinamool Congress party and retained her seat by defeating Swadeshranjan Das of the Communist Party of India (Marxist) by a margin of 3,205 votes. In 2005, she contested as a candidate of the Nationalist Congress Party and defeated Kakoli Ghosh Dastidar of Trinamool by 1,900 votes. In 2010, she was re-elected, this time as a candidate of Congress party.

Roy contested the 2014 Indian general election from Kolkata Dakshin constituency as a candidate of the Congress party. She came fourth and managed to secure 113,453 votes. On 7 March 2015, Roy who has been a fierce critic of Mamata Banerjee, rejoined her Trinamool Congress, ahead of the civic polls. After getting elected, she was made the chairperson of the municipal corporation. She became the first woman chairperson of the corporation. During her tenure as ward councillor, she turned the ward no.88 into the greenest ward of the city.

On 12 March 2019, party chairperson Mamata Banerjee announced that Roy would contest the upcoming general election from Kolkata Dakshin constituency after the sitting MP Subrata Bakshi refused to contest as he was interested in strengthening the party's organization. On 23 May, she was elected to the Lok Sabha after defeating Chandra Kumar Bose of the Bharatiya Janata Party, her nearest rival by a margin of approximately 155,192 votes. She was polled 573,119 votes compared to Bose's 417,927.

=== 2026 Rebellion ===
In June 2026, almost immediately after the massive Trinamool Congress defeat, around 20 MPs of TMC including Yusuf Pathan, Saayoni Ghosh, Bapi Halder, Mala Roy, Mitali Bag, Deepak Adhikari, Arup Chakraborty, Sharmila Sarkar, Satabdi Roy, Rachna Banerjee, Prasun Banerjee and others, allegedly declared rebellion from their Party, and presented their written wish to join Bhartiya Janata Party. This group was led by Kakoli Ghosh.

Later, on 14 June, 20 MPs, including Mala Roy, signed a formal letter declaring their split from Trinamool Congress as to merge with the Nationalist Citizen Party of India (NCPI). They formally submitted the letter to Lok Sabha Speaker Om Birla.

The total strength of TMC in Lok Sabha had been 28, so that a number of 20 MPS made it eligible for splitting from the Party, as per the Indian Defection laws, so as to escape the anti-defection disqualification.
