= 2026 Trinamool Congress split =

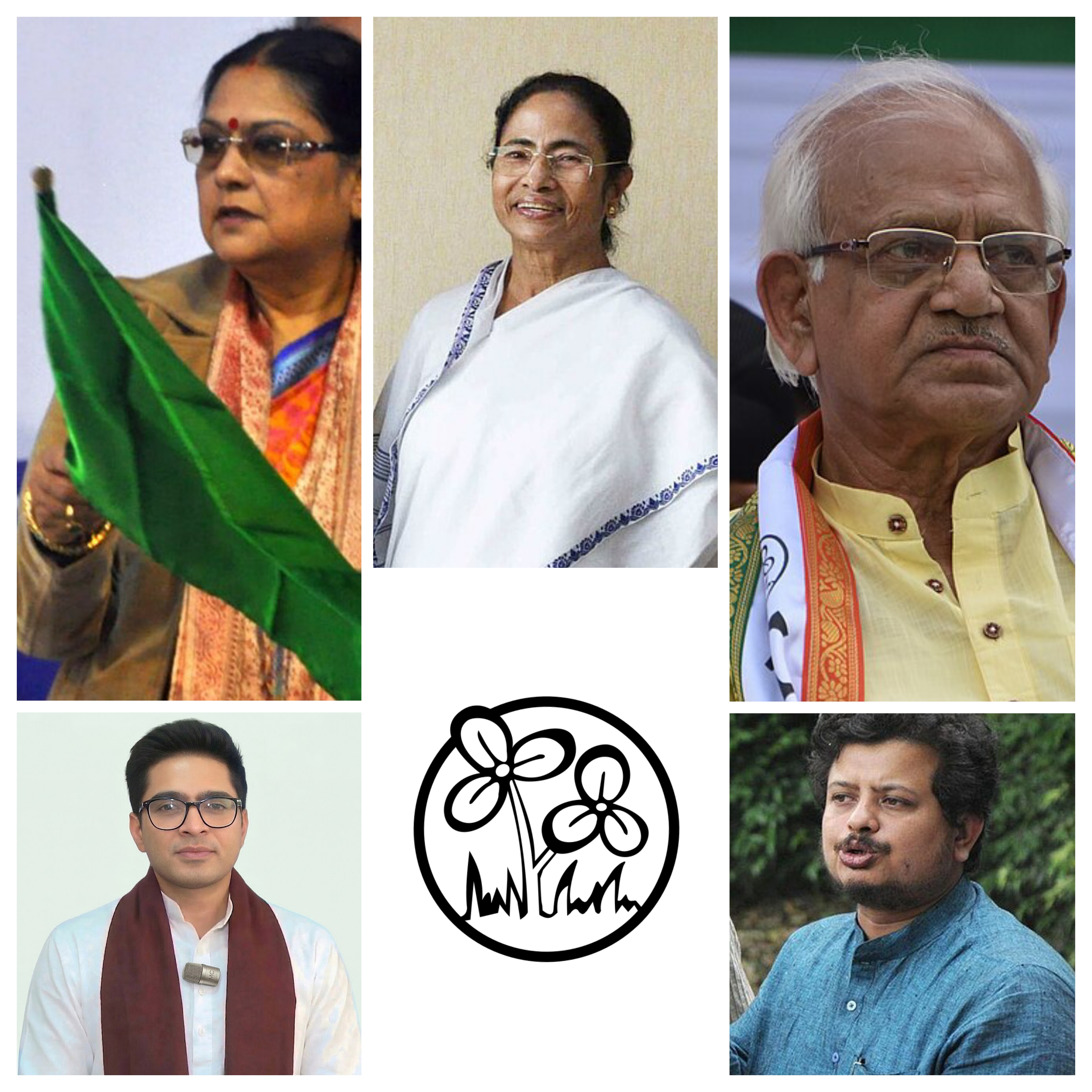
- Date: 2 June – 18 September 2026
- Location: Kolkata, West Bengal; Delhi
- Caused by: Defeat in 2026 West Bengal Legislative Assembly election; Appointment of Sovandeb Chattopadhyay as Leader of Opposition; Expulsion of Ritabrata Banerjee and Sandipan Saha from AITC; Revolts in AITC against Abhishek Banerjee
- Goals: Appointment of Ritabrata Banerjee as Leader of Opposition; Joining NDA in Lok Sabha
- Result: Ritabrata Banerjee appointed as Leader of Opposition in West Bengal Legislative Assembly; Split in Trinamool Congress and eventual disbandment of the party.; Four MPs resigned from Rajya Sabha; 20 MPs merged with NCPI and joined the NDA in Lok Sabha

Parties
Mamata All India Trinamool Congress (MAITC)	Nationalist Citizens Party of India (NCPI)	Democratic Trinamool Congress (DTC)

Lead figures
Mamata Banerjee	Kakoli Ghosh Dastidar	Ritabrata Banerjee

The 2026 Trinamool Congress (AITC) split refers to the fracturing of the regional party that had governed West Bengal for fifteen consecutive years, into two rival factions in June 2026. The rupture created the Mamata Banerjee–Abhishek Banerjee bloc (later renamed as Mamata All India Trinamool Congress with symbol "football player") and the Ritabrata Banerjee–Sandipan Saha bloc (Democratic Trinamool Congress with symbol "envelope") within the party following its defeat in the 2026 West Bengal polls. AITC was established in 1998, and the Election Commission of India recognises it as a regional party.

One faction of the party remained loyal to its founder and chairperson, Mamata Banerjee, and her nephew and general secretary, Abhishek Banerjee. The other—led by Ritabrata Banerjee and fellow Member of Legislative Assembly (MLA) Sandipan Saha—positioned itself as the party's legislative wing in the new assembly.

== Background ==
On 4 May 2026, after the 2026 West Bengal assembly polls result was declared, 15-year ruling AITC government led by the founder-chairperson of the party and then Chief Minister of West Bengal, Mamata Banerjee lost the power from the state and for the first time, the India's ruling party, Bharatiya Janata Party came to power in the state with former Trinamool leader and once Mamata's close aide Suvendu Adhikari succeeding as Chief Minister on 9 May, after Mamata. Mamata Banerjee herself lost her seat, Bhabanipur, to her successor, Adhikari.

After the defeat, Mamata Banerjee called a meeting of winning candidates in her residence in Kolkata, but out of 80 winning candidates, only 66 were present. Soon after, on 11 May, the party leadership declared former senior minister and newly elected AITC MLA from Ballygunge, Sovandeb Chattopadhyay, as the Leader of Opposition through a letter by Abhishek Banerjee, the party's General Secretary. But two AITC MLAs, namely Ritabrata Banerjee from Uluberia Purba and Sandipan Saha from Entally, allegedly complained to the Speaker of the Legislative Assembly, Rathindra Bose, that the MLAs' signatures on the letter are forged. On 22 May, during CM Suvendu's tour to New Delhi, Ritabrata and Suvendu held a secret meeting at Banga Bhawan.

Meanwhile, many councillors in various municipalities such as Bhatpara, Contai, and North Barrackpur resigned. In Chandannagar, the entire municipal board was dissolved after councillors and the mayor resigned. Soon after, on 26 May, MP from Barasat, Kakoli Ghosh Dastidar resigned from various AITC organisational posts, taking responsibility for the party's defeat. After her resignation, she attended CM Adhikari's administrative meeting in Kalyani with 20 elected AITC MLAs, including Swarupnagar MLA Bina Mondal, Haroa MLA Abdul Matin Muhammad, and Deganga MLA Anisur Rahaman Bidesh.

On 1 June 2026, Ritabrata and Sandipan were permanently suspended from the party for publicly insulting Abhishek Banerjee for defeat. Various spokespersons, including Riju Dutta, Kohinoor Mazumder, and Supriyo Chanda, were suspended from the party following their comments favouring the BJP government and Suvendu, and allegedly for anti-party activities such as openly blaming Abhishek Banerjee across various media platforms. Two Kolkata Municipal Corporation councillors, Arup Chakraborty and Susanta Ghosh, also resigned from their posts.

The Central Bureau of Investigation, Enforcement Directorate, National Investigation Agency, Kolkata Police, and West Bengal Police arrested several AITC councillors, former ministers, MLAs, and other leaders, including Sujit Bose and Saokat Molla, against whom several complaints were lodged across the state. After consulting with Mamata, former Minister and MLA from Kolkata Port and Mayor of Kolkata, Firhad Hakim resigned from his post on 5 June 2026.

== Outcome ==
After the suspension, 60 MLAs supported the Ritabrata–Sandipan faction, making Ritabrata the new Leader of Opposition and replacing Sovandeb Chattopadhyay. The list of 60 MLAs was handed over to the Speaker Rathindra Bose. The split dissolved all AITC committees, and the party announced a review of the party structure. After Ritabrata's appointment, a split occurred in the Lok Sabha and Rajya Sabha, as at least 20 Members of Parliament (MPs), led by Kakoli Ghosh Dastidar, decided to support the National Democratic Alliance government at the centre. Later, more MPs, including Mala Roy, Saayoni Ghosh, and Yusuf Pathan, also joined the rebels.

=== Split in the West Bengal Legislative Assembly ===
Following the suspension of the rebel legislators, 60 MLAs declared their support for the Ritabrata Banerjee-led faction, which was subsequently recognised by Speaker Rathindra Bose as the principal opposition bloc in the West Bengal Legislative Assembly. Ritabrata Banerjee replaced Sovandeb Chattopadhyay as Leader of the Opposition. The list of supporting MLAs was submitted to the Speaker. The split resulted in competing claims over the organisation and leadership of the All India Trinamool Congress, with the rebel faction subsequently forming a parallel organisational structure. On 22 June, the faction held a special session at which Arup Roy was elected chairperson and a 30-member National Working Committee was constituted, while the Mamata Banerjee-led faction continued to recognise Banerjee as party chairperson.

=== Split in the Lok Sabha and merger with NCPI ===
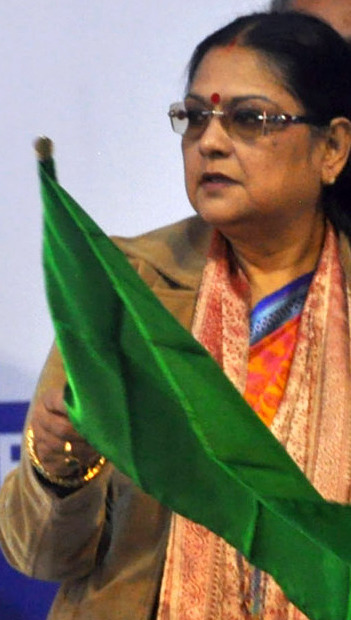
Leader of Rebel MPs, Kakoli Ghosh Dastidar

Following the rebellion in legislative assembly, a separate split occurred within the TMC's Lok Sabha parliamentary party. In June 2026, 20 of the party's 28 Lok Sabha MPs, led by Kakoli Ghosh Dastidar, broke away from the TMC parliamentary group and sought recognition as a separate bloc in the Lok Sabha. The group submitted a representation to Speaker Om Birla and announced that it would merge with the Nationalist Citizens Party of India (NCPI). The merger was accompanied by an announcement that the MPs would support the National Democratic Alliance (NDA) government at the centre. The rebel MPs also stated that they intended to continue their claim to the TMC's original name and election symbol before the Election Commission.

=== Rajya Sabha split, resignation and BJP re-election ===
The split was followed by a separate wave of resignations from the Rajya Sabha. Sukhendu Sekhar Roy resigned from both the TMC and his Rajya Sabha seat on 8 June 2026, citing the party's mismanagement during the election, followed by Sushmita Dev and Prakash Chik Baraik in the following days. The three resignations created vacancies in three Rajya Sabha seats from West Bengal. On 9 July, Roy, Dev and Baraik joined the Bharatiya Janata Party and were subsequently nominated by the party for the Rajya Sabha by-elections to the seats they had vacated. On 17 July, all three were elected unopposed to the Rajya Sabha as BJP candidates.

=== ECI action and new symbols ===
On 2 July 2026, Ritabrata, Sandipan, and eight other MLAs went to Delhi to meet Chief Election Commissioner Gyanesh Kumar to claim the party symbol and name, along with its funds. On 17 September 2026, ahead of the by-elections announced for Nandigram and Rejinagar, the Election Commission of India (ECI) issued an interim order recognising the existence of two rival groups within the All India Trinamool Congress and froze the party's name and its reserved "Flowers and Grass" symbol pending a substantive determination under Paragraph 15 of the Election Symbols (Reservation and Allotment) Order, 1968. The commission directed both factions to contest the by-elections under separate names and symbols. On 18 September, the ECI allotted the name Mamata All India Trinamool Congress and the "Football Player" symbol to the faction led by Mamata Banerjee, while the faction led by Arup Roy was allotted the name Democratic Trinamool Congress and the "Envelope" symbol. The allotments were made as an interim arrangement for the by-elections and did not constitute a final determination of which faction was entitled to the original party name and symbol.

=== Allegations of fabrication of affidavits ===
The Mamata All India Trinamool Congress lodged a complaint on 20 November at Kalighat Police station, regarding the fabrication of affidavits. It alleged Ritabrata Banerjee, Arup Roy, two officers from Nanoor Police Station, and other personnel from the same, of fabricating, forging, and authenticating false affidavits using notarial stamps. It also alleged forging the signatures of the citizens and a Notary Public. These fabricated affidavits were allegedly prepared in order to demonstrate support for the Ritabrata-led rebel faction (later allotted the name Democratic Trinamool Congress) in front of the Election Commission of India (ECI). The complaint filed by Subhashish Chakraborty stated that this was done in order to show the support of Arup Roy as the leader of All India Trinamool Congress (instead of Mamata Banerjee).

== Split and merger with NCPI in Lok Sabha ==
Kakoli Ghosh Dastidar formed a group within the AITC and challenged Abhishek Banerjee's leadership. She met with several other MPs and Union Minister Bhupender Yadav in Delhi. Soon after, she claimed that her group supported the Modi government. She sent a letter of support from the majority of AITC MPs to Om Birla, the Lok Sabha Speaker.

Nationalist Citizens Party of India

The Rebels have announced a temporary merger with the NCPI and will fight for legitimacy as the Real AITC in the Supreme Court. On 14 June 2026, Dastidar and other MPs, announced their merger with the NCPI.

=== List of Rebel Lok Sabha MPs, now NCPI MPs ===
No.	Constituency	Portrait	Name	Notes
1	Cooch Behar (SC)		Jagadish Chandra Barma Basunia	
2	Jangipur		Khalilur Rahaman	
3	Baharampur		Yusuf Pathan	
4	Murshidabad		Abu Taher Khan	
5	Barrackpore		Partha Bhowmick	
6	Barasat		Kakoli Ghosh Dastidar	Leader
7	Mathurapur (SC)		Bapi Halder	
8	Jadavpur		Saayoni Ghosh	
9	Kolkata Dakshin		Mala Roy	
10	Kolkata Uttar		Sudip Bandyopadhyay	
11	Howrah		Prasun Banerjee	
12	Hooghly		Rachana Banerjee	
13	Arambagh (SC)		Mitali Bag	
14	Ghatal		Deepak Adhikari	
15	Jhargram (ST)		Kalipada Soren	
16	Medinipur		June Malia	
17	Bankura		Arup Chakraborty	
18	Bardhaman Purba (SC)		Sharmila Sarkar	
19	Bolpur (SC)		Asit Kumar Mal	
20	Birbhum		Satabdi Roy	Deputy Leader

== Split in the Legislative Assembly ==
The Split first occurred in the Legislative Assembly when Ritabrata Banerjee and Sandipan Saha complained to the Speaker of the West Bengal Legislative Assembly and secured support of 65 MLAs, including their signatures, for appointing Ritabrata as the leader of the opposition.

The following are some of the names of the MLAs who have rebelled:

No.	MLA Name	Constituency
45	Prasun Banerjee	Chanchal
53	Sabina Yeasmin	Sujapur
56	Md Noor Alam	Samserganj
59	Akhruzzaman	Raghunathganj
60	Bayron Biswas	Sagardighi
73	Niamot Sheikh	Hariharpara
112	Madan Mitra	Kamarhati
118	Rathin Ghosh	Madhyamgram
120	Anisur Rahaman Bidesh	Deganga
122	Usha Rani Mondal	Minakhan
128	Nilima Mistry	Basanti
130	Samir Kumar Jana	Patharpratima
133	Barnali Dhara	Kulpi
149	Javed Ahmed Khan	Kasba
155	Subhasis Das	Maheshtala
158	Firhad Hakim	Kolkata Port
163	Sandipan Saha	Entally
171	Arup Roy	Howrah Madhya
174	Priya Paul	Sankrail
175	Gulsan Mullick	Panchla
176	Ritabrata Banerjee	Uluberia Purba
184	Tapas Maity	Domjur
194	Swati Khandoker	Chanditala
235	Seuli Saha	Keshpur
286	Chandranath Sinha	Bolpur

== See also ==
- 2022 Maharashtra political crisis
- 2026 West Bengal Legislative Assembly election
- Surat Split – 1907 division of the Indian National Congress
- List of Indian National Congress breakaway parties - Trinamool Congress being one of them
- List of Janata Dal breakaway parties – Loose grouping of Indian political parties
- 1964 split in the Communist Party of India – Conflict between Leftists, Centrists and Rightists
- 2022 Shiv Sena split – Indian political incident
- 2023 Nationalist Congress Party split – Indian political incident
