= 2026 Kolkata Municipal Corporation election =

Upcoming Indian election in West Bengal

- December 2026

All 209 wards for Kolkata Municipal Corporation 105 seats needed for a majority
- Turnout: TBD

	First party	Second party	Third party
Leader	Samik Bhattacharya	Nandita Roy	Subhankar Sarkar
Party	BJP	CPI(M)	INC
Alliance	None	LF	None
Last election	3 seats, 9.21% vote	1 seat, 9.65% vote	2 seats, 4.12% vote
Seats before	4	1	0
	Fourth party	Fifth party
Leader	Madhuchhanda Deb	Mamata Banerjee
Party	CPI	MAITC
Alliance	LF	None
Last election	1 seat, 1.02% vote	Party split
Seats before	1	New
Mayor before election
Vacant
Elected Mayor
TBD

The 2026 Kolkata Municipal Corporation election will be held within December 7, 2026 tentatively to elect 209 members of the Kolkata Municipal Corporation (KMC) which governs Kolkata, the capital of the Indian state of West Bengal.

== Background ==
In 2026 West Bengal Legislative Assembly election, Bharatiya Janata Party got a majority by winning 208 seats out of 294 seats and this marked the end of 15-year rule of Mamata Banerjee led Trinamool Congress government in the state.

Soon after the defeat, factionalism within AITC intensified and more than two-thirds of AITC MLAs joined the rebel faction led by Ritabrata Banerjee with Banerjee becoming Leader of Opposition and 20 Lok Sabha MPs merged with Nationalist Citizens Party of India which became part of National Democratic Alliance. The AITC subsequently split into 3 factions, namely the Nationalist Citizens Party of India led by Kakoli Ghosh Dastidar in Lok Sabha, the Democratic Trinamool Congress led by Ritabrata Banerjee and Mamata All India Trinamool Congress led by Mamata Banerjee.

On 3 June 2026, Firhad Hakim resigned as Kolkata mayor and the corporation was eventually dissolved with many AITC councillors resigning from their positions. Smita Pandey was appointed the administrator of KMC on 9 June 2026.

Subsequently, a delimitation exercise was undertaken by the Kolkata Municipal Corporation to expand the number of wards from 144 to 209. In August 2026, the West Bengal Legislative Assembly passed the Kolkata Municipal Corporation (Amendment) Bill, 2026 to increase the number of wards in KMC from 144 to 209. In October 2026, KMC published the draft electoral roll with 32 lakh (3.2 million) voters who will take part in election that will be held in November 2026.

== Schedule ==
Poll event	Schedule
Notification date	
Last Date for filing nomination	
Last Date for withdrawal of nomination	
Date of poll	
Date of counting of votes	

== Parties and alliances ==
=== Bharatiya Janata Party ===
Bharatiya Janata Party
Party	Flag	Symbol	Leader	Seats contested
Bharatiya Janata Party			Samik Bhattacharya	TBD

=== Left Front ===
Left Front
Party	Flag	Symbol	Leader	Seats contested
Communist Party of India (Marxist)			Mohammed Salim	TBD
Communist Party of India			Swapan Banerjee	TBD
All India Forward Bloc			Gobinda Roy	TBD
Revolutionary Socialist Party			Tapan Hore	TBD
Communist Party of India (Marxist–Leninist) Liberation			Abhijit Majumder	TBD
Revolutionary Communist Party of India			Subhash Roy	TBD
Marxist Forward Bloc			Ashish Chakraborty	TBD

=== Others ===
Party	Flag	Symbol	Leader	Seats contested
Mamata All India Trinamool Congress			Mamata Banerjee	TBD
Indian National Congress			Subhankar Sarkar	TBD
Socialist Unity Centre of India (Communist)			Provash Ghosh	TBD
Aam Aadmi Party			Sanjoy Basu	TBD
Bahujan Samaj Party			Achintya Kumar Biswas	TBD
All India Majlis-e-Ittehadul Muslimeen		kite	Imran Solanki	TBD
Democratic Trinamool Congress			Ritabrata Banerjee	TBD

== Candidates ==
List of candidates
No.	Ward								
No.	Ward	BJP		Left Front		INC		MAITC	
No.	Ward	Party	Candidate	Party	Candidate	Party	Candidate	Party	Candidate
1	Ward 1	BJP		LF		INC		MAITC	
2	Ward 2	BJP		LF		INC		MAITC	
3	Ward 3	BJP		LF		INC		MAITC	
4	Ward 4	BJP		LF		INC		MAITC	
5	Ward 5	BJP		LF		INC		MAITC	
6	Ward 6	BJP		LF		INC		MAITC	
7	Ward 7	BJP		LF		INC		MAITC	
8	Ward 8	BJP		LF		INC		MAITC	
9	Ward 9	BJP		LF		INC		MAITC	
10	Ward 10	BJP		LF		INC		MAITC	
11	Ward 11	BJP		LF		INC		MAITC	
12	Ward 12	BJP		LF		INC		MAITC	
13	Ward 13	BJP		LF		INC		MAITC	
14	Ward 14	BJP		LF		INC		MAITC	
15	Ward 15	BJP		LF		INC		MAITC	
16	Ward 16	BJP		LF		INC		MAITC	
17	Ward 17	BJP		LF		INC		MAITC	
18	Ward 18	BJP		LF		INC		MAITC	
19	Ward 19	BJP		LF		INC		MAITC	
20	Ward 20	BJP		LF		INC		MAITC	
21	Ward 21	BJP		LF		INC		MAITC	
22	Ward 22	BJP		LF		INC		MAITC	
23	Ward 23	BJP		LF		INC		MAITC	
24	Ward 24	BJP		LF		INC		MAITC	
25	Ward 25	BJP		LF		INC		MAITC	
26	Ward 26	BJP		LF		INC		MAITC	
27	Ward 27	BJP		LF		INC		MAITC	
28	Ward 28	BJP		LF		INC		MAITC	
29	Ward 29	BJP		LF		INC		MAITC	
30	Ward 30	BJP		LF		INC		MAITC	
31	Ward 31	BJP		LF		INC		MAITC	
32	Ward 32	BJP		LF		INC		MAITC	
33	Ward 33	BJP		LF		INC		MAITC	
34	Ward 34	BJP		LF		INC		MAITC	
35	Ward 35	BJP		LF		INC		MAITC	
36	Ward 36	BJP		LF		INC		MAITC	
37	Ward 37	BJP		LF		INC		MAITC	
38	Ward 38	BJP		LF		INC		MAITC	
39	Ward 39	BJP		LF		INC		MAITC	
40	Ward 40	BJP		LF		INC		MAITC	
41	Ward 41	BJP		LF		INC		MAITC	
42	Ward 42	BJP		LF		INC		MAITC	
43	Ward 43	BJP		LF		INC		MAITC	
44	Ward 44	BJP		LF		INC		MAITC	
45	Ward 45	BJP		LF		INC		MAITC	
46	Ward 46	BJP		LF		INC		MAITC	
47	Ward 47	BJP		LF		INC		MAITC	
48	Ward 48	BJP		LF		INC		MAITC	
49	Ward 49	BJP		LF		INC		MAITC	
50	Ward 50	BJP		LF		INC		MAITC	
51	Ward 51	BJP		LF		INC		MAITC	
52	Ward 52	BJP		LF		INC		MAITC	
53	Ward 53	BJP		LF		INC		MAITC	
54	Ward 54	BJP		LF		INC		MAITC	
55	Ward 55	BJP		LF		INC		MAITC	
56	Ward 56	BJP		LF		INC		MAITC	
57	Ward 57	BJP		LF		INC		MAITC	
58	Ward 58	BJP		LF		INC		MAITC	
59	Ward 59	BJP		LF		INC		MAITC	
60	Ward 60	BJP		LF		INC		MAITC	
61	Ward 61	BJP		LF		INC		MAITC	
62	Ward 62	BJP		LF		INC		MAITC	
63	Ward 63	BJP		LF		INC		MAITC	
64	Ward 64	BJP		LF		INC		MAITC	
65	Ward 65	BJP		LF		INC		MAITC	
66	Ward 66	BJP		LF		INC		MAITC	
67	Ward 67	BJP		LF		INC		MAITC	
68	Ward 68	BJP		LF		INC		MAITC	
69	Ward 69	BJP		LF		INC		MAITC	
70	Ward 70	BJP		LF		INC		MAITC	
71	Ward 71	BJP		LF		INC		MAITC	
72	Ward 72	BJP		LF		INC		MAITC	
73	Ward 73	BJP		LF		INC		MAITC	
74	Ward 74	BJP		LF		INC		MAITC	
75	Ward 75	BJP		LF		INC		MAITC	
76	Ward 76	BJP		LF		INC		MAITC	
77	Ward 77	BJP		LF		INC		MAITC	
78	Ward 78	BJP		LF		INC		MAITC	
79	Ward 79	BJP		LF		INC		MAITC	
80	Ward 80	BJP		LF		INC		MAITC	
81	Ward 81	BJP		LF		INC		MAITC	
82	Ward 82	BJP		LF		INC		MAITC	
83	Ward 83	BJP		LF		INC		MAITC	
84	Ward 84	BJP		LF		INC		MAITC	
85	Ward 85	BJP		LF		INC		MAITC	
86	Ward 86	BJP		LF		INC		MAITC	
87	Ward 87	BJP		LF		INC		MAITC	
88	Ward 88	BJP		LF		INC		MAITC	
89	Ward 89	BJP		LF		INC		MAITC	
90	Ward 90	BJP		LF		INC		MAITC	
91	Ward 91	BJP		LF		INC		MAITC	
92	Ward 92	BJP		LF		INC		MAITC	
93	Ward 93	BJP		LF		INC		MAITC	
94	Ward 94	BJP		LF		INC		MAITC	
95	Ward 95	BJP		LF		INC		MAITC	
96	Ward 96	BJP		LF		INC		MAITC	
97	Ward 97	BJP		LF		INC		MAITC	
98	Ward 98	BJP		LF		INC		MAITC	
99	Ward 99	BJP		LF		INC		MAITC	
100	Ward 100	BJP		LF		INC		MAITC	
101	Ward 101	BJP		LF		INC		MAITC	
102	Ward 102	BJP		LF		INC		MAITC	
103	Ward 103	BJP		LF		INC		MAITC	
104	Ward 104	BJP		LF		INC		MAITC	
105	Ward 105	BJP		LF		INC		MAITC	
106	Ward 106	BJP		LF		INC		MAITC	
107	Ward 107	BJP		LF		INC		MAITC	
108	Ward 108	BJP		LF		INC		MAITC	
109	Ward 109	BJP		LF		INC		MAITC	
110	Ward 110	BJP		LF		INC		MAITC	
111	Ward 111	BJP		LF		INC		MAITC	
112	Ward 112	BJP		LF		INC		MAITC	
113	Ward 113	BJP		LF		INC		MAITC	
114	Ward 114	BJP		LF		INC		MAITC	
115	Ward 115	BJP		LF		INC		MAITC	
116	Ward 116	BJP		LF		INC		MAITC	
117	Ward 117	BJP		LF		INC		MAITC	
118	Ward 118	BJP		LF		INC		MAITC	
119	Ward 119	BJP		LF		INC		MAITC	
120	Ward 120	BJP		LF		INC		MAITC	
121	Ward 121	BJP		LF		INC		MAITC	
122	Ward 122	BJP		LF		INC		MAITC	
123	Ward 123	BJP		LF		INC		MAITC	
124	Ward 124	BJP		LF		INC		MAITC	
125	Ward 125	BJP		LF		INC		MAITC	
126	Ward 126	BJP		LF		INC		MAITC	
127	Ward 127	BJP		LF		INC		MAITC	
128	Ward 128	BJP		LF		INC		MAITC	
129	Ward 129	BJP		LF		INC		MAITC	
130	Ward 130	BJP		LF		INC		MAITC	
131	Ward 131	BJP		LF		INC		MAITC	
132	Ward 132	BJP		LF		INC		MAITC	
133	Ward 133	BJP		LF		INC		MAITC	
134	Ward 134	BJP		LF		INC		MAITC	
135	Ward 135	BJP		LF		INC		MAITC	
136	Ward 136	BJP		LF		INC		MAITC	
137	Ward 137	BJP		LF		INC		MAITC	
138	Ward 138	BJP		LF		INC		MAITC	
139	Ward 139	BJP		LF		INC		MAITC	
140	Ward 140	BJP		LF		INC		MAITC	
141	Ward 141	BJP		LF		INC		MAITC	
142	Ward 142	BJP		LF		INC		MAITC	
143	Ward 143	BJP		LF		INC		MAITC	
144	Ward 144	BJP		LF		INC		MAITC	
145	Ward 145	BJP		LF		INC		MAITC	
146	Ward 146	BJP		LF		INC		MAITC	
147	Ward 147	BJP		LF		INC		MAITC	
148	Ward 148	BJP		LF		INC		MAITC	
149	Ward 149	BJP		LF		INC		MAITC	
150	Ward 150	BJP		LF		INC		MAITC	
151	Ward 151	BJP		LF		INC		MAITC	
152	Ward 152	BJP		LF		INC		MAITC	
153	Ward 153	BJP		LF		INC		MAITC	
154	Ward 154	BJP		LF		INC		MAITC	
155	Ward 155	BJP		LF		INC		MAITC	
156	Ward 156	BJP		LF		INC		MAITC	
157	Ward 157	BJP		LF		INC		MAITC	
158	Ward 158	BJP		LF		INC		MAITC	
159	Ward 159	BJP		LF		INC		MAITC	
160	Ward 160	BJP		LF		INC		MAITC	
161	Ward 161	BJP		LF		INC		MAITC	
162	Ward 162	BJP		LF		INC		MAITC	
163	Ward 163	BJP		LF		INC		MAITC	
164	Ward 164	BJP		LF		INC		MAITC	
165	Ward 165	BJP		LF		INC		MAITC	
166	Ward 166	BJP		LF		INC		MAITC	
167	Ward 167	BJP		LF		INC		MAITC	
168	Ward 168	BJP		LF		INC		MAITC	
169	Ward 169	BJP		LF		INC		MAITC	
170	Ward 170	BJP		LF		INC		MAITC	
171	Ward 171	BJP		LF		INC		MAITC	
172	Ward 172	BJP		LF		INC		MAITC	
173	Ward 173	BJP		LF		INC		MAITC	
174	Ward 174	BJP		LF		INC		MAITC	
175	Ward 175	BJP		LF		INC		MAITC	
176	Ward 176	BJP		LF		INC		MAITC	
177	Ward 177	BJP		LF		INC		MAITC	
178	Ward 178	BJP		LF		INC		MAITC	
179	Ward 179	BJP		LF		INC		MAITC	
180	Ward 180	BJP		LF		INC		MAITC	
181	Ward 181	BJP		LF		INC		MAITC	
182	Ward 182	BJP		LF		INC		MAITC	
183	Ward 183	BJP		LF		INC		MAITC	
184	Ward 184	BJP		LF		INC		MAITC	
185	Ward 185	BJP		LF		INC		MAITC	
186	Ward 186	BJP		LF		INC		MAITC	
187	Ward 187	BJP		LF		INC		MAITC	
188	Ward 188	BJP		LF		INC		MAITC	
189	Ward 189	BJP		LF		INC		MAITC	
190	Ward 190	BJP		LF		INC		MAITC	
195	Ward 195	BJP		LF		INC		MAITC	
196	Ward 196	BJP		LF		INC		MAITC	
197	Ward 197	BJP		LF		INC		MAITC	
198	Ward 198	BJP		LF		INC		MAITC	
199	Ward 199	BJP		LF		INC		MAITC	
200	Ward 200	BJP		LF		INC		MAITC	
201	Ward 201	BJP		LF		INC		MAITC	
202	Ward 202	BJP		LF		INC		MAITC	
203	Ward 203	BJP		LF		INC		MAITC	
204	Ward 204	BJP		LF		INC		MAITC	
205	Ward 205	BJP		LF		INC		MAITC	
206	Ward 206	BJP		LF		INC		MAITC	
207	Ward 207	BJP		LF		INC		MAITC	
208	Ward 208	BJP		LF		INC		MAITC	
209	Ward 209	BJP		LF		INC		MAITC	

== Voters Turnout ==
No. of Voters	No. of Voters who cast votes	Voters Turnout (%)

== Result ==
=== Results by Parties ===
0	0	0	0	0	0
BJP	CPI(M)	MAITC	INC	CPI	IND

Vote share by alliance
1. NDA (0.00%)
2. LF+ (0.00%)
3. MAITC (0.00%)
4. INC (0.00%)
5. NOTA (0.00%)
6. IND (0.00%)
7. Others (0.00%)
Vote share by Party
1. BJP (0.00%)
2. CPI(M) (0.00%)
3. MAITC (0.00%)
4. INC (0.00%)
5. CPI (0.00%)
6. RSP (0.00%)
7. AIFB (0.00%)
8. CPI(ML)L (0.00%)
9. RCPI (0.00%)
10. MFB (0.00%)
11. SUCI(C) (0.00%)
12. BSP (0.00%)
13. AIMIM (0.00%)
14. Others (0.00%)
15. IND (0.00%)
16. NOTA (0.00%)

Alliance / Party		Popular vote			Seats		
Alliance / Party		Votes	%	±pp	Contested	Won	+/-
BJP							
Total							
LF+	CPI(M)						
LF+	CPI						
LF+	RSP						
LF+	AIFB						
LF+	CPI(ML)L						
LF+	RCPI						
LF+	MFB						
Total							
MAITC							
DTC							
INC							
SUCI(C)							
BSP							
IND							
NOTA							
Total				—			—

=== Results by Wards ===
Results
Ward Details		Winner			Runner Up			Margin
Borough	Ward	Party	Candidate	Votes	Party	Candidate	Votes	Margin
TBA	Ward 1							
TBA	Ward 2							
TBA	Ward 3							
TBA	Ward 4							
TBA	Ward 5							
TBA	Ward 6							
TBA	Ward 7							
TBA	Ward 8							
TBA	Ward 9							
TBA	Ward 10							
TBA	Ward 11							
TBA	Ward 12							
TBA	Ward 13							
TBA	Ward 14							
TBA	Ward 15							
TBA	Ward 16							
TBA	Ward 17							
TBA	Ward 18							
TBA	Ward 19							
TBA	Ward 20							
TBA	Ward 21							
TBA	Ward 22							
TBA	Ward 23							
TBA	Ward 24							
TBA	Ward 25							
TBA	Ward 26							
TBA	Ward 27							
TBA	Ward 28							
TBA	Ward 29							
TBA	Ward 30							
TBA	Ward 31							
TBA	Ward 32							
TBA	Ward 33							
TBA	Ward 34							
TBA	Ward 35							
TBA	Ward 36							
TBA	Ward 37							
TBA	Ward 38							
TBA	Ward 39							
TBA	Ward 40							
TBA	Ward 41							
TBA	Ward 42							
TBA	Ward 43							
TBA	Ward 44							
TBA	Ward 45							
TBA	Ward 46							
TBA	Ward 47							
TBA	Ward 48							
TBA	Ward 49							
TBA	Ward 50							
TBA	Ward 51							
TBA	Ward 52							
TBA	Ward 53							
TBA	Ward 54							
TBA	Ward 55							
TBA	Ward 56							
TBA	Ward 57							
TBA	Ward 58							
TBA	Ward 59							
TBA	Ward 60							
TBA	Ward 61							
TBA	Ward 62							
TBA	Ward 63							
TBA	Ward 64							
TBA	Ward 65							
TBA	Ward 66							
TBA	Ward 67							
TBA	Ward 68							
TBA	Ward 69							
TBA	Ward 70							
TBA	Ward 71							
TBA	Ward 72							
TBA	Ward 73							
TBA	Ward 74							
TBA	Ward 75							
TBA	Ward 76							
TBA	Ward 77							
TBA	Ward 78							
TBA	Ward 79							
TBA	Ward 80							
TBA	Ward 81							
TBA	Ward 82							
TBA	Ward 83							
TBA	Ward 84							
TBA	Ward 85							
TBA	Ward 86							
TBA	Ward 87							
TBA	Ward 88							
TBA	Ward 89							
TBA	Ward 90							
TBA	Ward 91							
TBA	Ward 92							
TBA	Ward 93							
TBA	Ward 94							
TBA	Ward 95							
TBA	Ward 96							
TBA	Ward 97							
TBA	Ward 98							
TBA	Ward 99							
TBA	Ward 100							
TBA	Ward 101							
TBA	Ward 102							
TBA	Ward 103							
TBA	Ward 104							
TBA	Ward 105							
TBA	Ward 106							
TBA	Ward 107							
TBA	Ward 108							
TBA	Ward 109							
TBA	Ward 110							
TBA	Ward 111							
TBA	Ward 112							
TBA	Ward 113							
TBA	Ward 114							
TBA	Ward 115							
TBA	Ward 116							
TBA	Ward 117							
TBA	Ward 118							
TBA	Ward 119							
TBA	Ward 120							
TBA	Ward 121							
TBA	Ward 122							
TBA	Ward 123							
TBA	Ward 124							
TBA	Ward 125							
TBA	Ward 126							
TBA	Ward 127							
TBA	Ward 128							
TBA	Ward 129							
TBA	Ward 130							
TBA	Ward 131							
TBA	Ward 132							
TBA	Ward 133							
TBA	Ward 134							
TBA	Ward 135							
TBA	Ward 136							
TBA	Ward 137							
TBA	Ward 138							
TBA	Ward 139							
TBA	Ward 140							
TBA	Ward 141							
TBA	Ward 142							
TBA	Ward 143							
TBA	Ward 144							
TBA	Ward 145							
TBA	Ward 146							
TBA	Ward 147							
TBA	Ward 148							
TBA	Ward 149							
TBA	Ward 150							
TBA	Ward 151							
TBA	Ward 152							
TBA	Ward 153							
TBA	Ward 154							
TBA	Ward 155							
TBA	Ward 156							
TBA	Ward 157							
TBA	Ward 158							
TBA	Ward 159							
TBA	Ward 160							
TBA	Ward 161							
TBA	Ward 162							
TBA	Ward 163							
TBA	Ward 164							
TBA	Ward 165							
TBA	Ward 166							
TBA	Ward 167							
TBA	Ward 168							
TBA	Ward 169							
TBA	Ward 170							
TBA	Ward 171							
TBA	Ward 172							
TBA	Ward 173							
TBA	Ward 174							
TBA	Ward 175							
TBA	Ward 176							
TBA	Ward 177							
TBA	Ward 178							
TBA	Ward 179							
TBA	Ward 180							
TBA	Ward 181							
TBA	Ward 182							
TBA	Ward 183							
TBA	Ward 184							
TBA	Ward 185							
TBA	Ward 186							
TBA	Ward 187							
TBA	Ward 188							
TBA	Ward 189							
TBA	Ward 190							
TBA	Ward 195							
TBA	Ward 196							
TBA	Ward 197							
TBA	Ward 198							
TBA	Ward 199							
TBA	Ward 200							
TBA	Ward 201							
TBA	Ward 202							
TBA	Ward 203							
TBA	Ward 204							
TBA	Ward 205							
TBA	Ward 206							
TBA	Ward 207							
TBA	Ward 208							
TBA	Ward 209							

== See also ==
- Kolkata Municipal Corporation
- 2021 West Bengal Legislative Assembly election
- 2023 West Bengal Panchayat elections
- 2024 Indian general election in West Bengal
- 2026 West Bengal Legislative Assembly election
- 2026 elections in India
