= Subhas Chandra Panja =

Indian politician (born 1958)

Subhas Chandra Panja (born 1958) is an Indian politician from West Bengal. He is a member of the West Bengal Legislative Assembly from the Mahisadal Assembly constituency in Purba Medinipur district representing the Bharatiya Janata Party.

== Early life and education ==
Panja is from Mahisadal, Purba Medinipur district, West Bengal. He is the son of Pramathnath Panja. He completed his Diploma in Licentiate in Electrical Engineering (LEE) at Jagadish Chandra Polytechnic College. He runs his own business. He declared assets worth Rs.6 crore in his affidavit to the Election Commission of India.

== Career ==
Panja won the Mahisadal Assembly constituency representing the Bharatiya Janata Party in the 2026 West Bengal Legislative Assembly election. He polled 1,21,584 votes and defeated his nearest rival and sitting MLA, Tilak Kumar Chakraborty of the All India Trinamool Congress by a margin of 26,238 votes.
