= Baidyanath Chakrabarty =

Indian doctor (c. 1927 – 2022)

- Born: 1927 or 1928; Faridpur, Bengal Presidency, British Raj
- Died: 15 April 2022 (aged 94); Bidhannagar, Kolkata, India
- Occupations: Gynaecologist; reproductive medicine researcher

Baidyanath Chakrabarty (Note: Chakrabarty's last name is alternately spelled as Chakravarty and Chakraborty) (1927 or 1928 – 15 April 2022) was an Indian doctor and reproductive health specialist who was considered a pioneer of reproductive medicine in the country. He was the founder of the Institute of Reproductive Medicine, in Salt Lake, Kolkata, focused on assisted reproductive research. In a career spanning over seven decades, he had performed over 4,000 IVF procedures.

== Early life ==
Chakrabarty was born in Faridpur in modern-day Bangladesh, in what was then the undivided Bengal. He was the eldest of nine siblings. His father was a signalman with the railways with a transferable job. Chakrabarty stayed back in Chakradharpur, in present-day Jharkhand, when the family traveled along with his father.

He was a topper in his school in his matriculation examinations and received a scholarship from politician Syama Prasad Mukherjee to study at Asutosh College at the University of Calcutta. He studied medicine at the Bengal Medical College, graduating as a topper in gynaecology in 1952. He later traveled to England to complete his post-graduate degree in gynaecology and graduated a Member of Royal College of Obstetricians and Gynaecologists. Having completed his studies in England, he faced financial difficulties in paying for his return trip and ended up taking a hospital job in that country before returning to India.

== Career ==
Chakrabarty started his career as a member of the faculty at NRS Medical College. During his time here he met and collaborated with Subhash Mukherjee, who delivered Durga, India's first baby by in vitro fertilisation (IVF). Chakrabarty collaborated with Mukherjee on various topics related to fertility medicine. Chakrabarty continued the duo's research after Mukherjee's suicide in 1981.

He collaborated with other doctors including Sudarshan Ghosh Dastidar in setting up of an IVF laboratory. Chakrabarty set up the Institute of Reproductive Medicine in Salt Lake, a satellite city of modern-day Kolkata, in 1986 after retiring as a professor of obstetrics and gynaecology at the NRS Medical College. The institute focused on assisted reproductive technologies and research. He donated the institute to the Indian Council of Medical Research (ICMR) in 2019. As of 2019, the institute treated about 3,000 couples seeking assisted reproductive support annually. Some of his other contributions included advancing embryo transfer technology and development of cost-effective ovulation induction protocols for women after multiple IVF failures. He also studied the genetic linkages to infertility, role of stress in infertility, and endometrial receptivity in endometriosis and recurrent miscarriages.

Earlier, in 1998, he was the chair of the ICMR committee that was chartered to draft the "national guidelines for accreditation, supervision, and regulation of assisted reproductive technology clinics" in India. In a career spanning seven decades, Chakrabarty performed over 4,000 IVF procedures and was considered a pioneer of IVF and artificial insemination research and treatment in the country. He received a Lifetime Achievement Award in 2019 from the West Bengal government.

== Personal life ==
Chakrabarty was married to his wife Manjushree, also a doctor, whom he met on his return from England. The couple had two children. He was known to be a fan of Indian cricket, noting in a 2016 interview, "Virat Kohli and Ashwin are such good boys!".

Chakrabarty died on 15 April 2022 in Salt Lake City in Kolkata. He was aged 94. He had earlier been admitted to the Calcutta Heart Clinic after suffering a cerebral stroke and had also undergone an angioplasty.

== Select publications ==
- Sharma, Sunita; Bathwal, Shikha; Agarwal, Nupur; Chattopadhyay, Ratna; Saha, Indranil; Chakravarty, Baidyanath (1 January 2019). "Does presence of adenomyosis affect reproductive outcome in IVF cycles? A retrospective analysis of 973 patients". Reproductive BioMedicine Online. 38 (1): 13–21. doi:10.1016/j.rbmo.2018.09.014. ISSN 1472-6483. PMID 30446308. S2CID 53568847.
- Mitra, Amrita; Chakraborty, Baidyanath; Mukhopadhay, Dyutiman; Pal, Manisha; Mukherjee, Sanjit; Banerjee, Samir; Chaudhuri, Keya (1 October 2012). "Effect of smoking on semen quality, FSH, testosterone level, and CAG repeat length in androgen receptor gene of infertile men in an Indian city". Systems Biology in Reproductive Medicine. 58 (5): 255–262. doi:10.3109/19396368.2012.684195. ISSN 1939-6368. PMID 22578234. S2CID 20084472.
- Gupta, Nishi; Sudhakar, Digumarthi V. S.; Gangwar, Pravin Kumar; Sankhwar, Satya Narayan; Gupta, Nalini J.; Chakraborty, Baidyanath; Thangaraj, Kumarasamy; Gupta, Gopal; Rajender, Singh (11 September 2017). "Mutations in the prostate specific antigen (PSA/KLK3) correlate with male infertility". Scientific Reports. 7 (1): 11225. Bibcode:2017NatSR...711225G. doi:10.1038/s41598-017-10866-1. ISSN 2045-2322. PMC 5593825. PMID 28894123.
- Dixit, Hridesh; Rao, Lakshmi K.; Padmalatha, Venkata V.; Kanakavalli, Murthy; Deenadayal, Mamata; Gupta, Nalini; Chakrabarty, Baidyanath; Singh, Lalji (1 May 2006). "Missense mutations in the BMP15 gene are associated with ovarian failure". Human Genetics. 119 (4): 408–415. doi:10.1007/s00439-006-0150-0. ISSN 1432-1203. PMID 16508750. S2CID 10134900.
- Panda, Bineet; Rao, Lakshmi; Tosh, Durgadatta; Dixit, Hridesh; Padmalatha, Venkata; Kanakavalli, Murthy; Raseswari, Turlapati; Deenadayal, Mamata; Gupta, Nalini; Chakrabarty, Baidyanath; Nallari, Pratibha (1 August 2011). "Germline study of AR gene of Indian women with ovarian failure". Gynecological Endocrinology. 27 (8): 572–578. doi:10.3109/09513590.2010.507282. ISSN 0951-3590. PMID 20672904. S2CID 35302256.
- Rajender, S.; Pooja, S.; Gupta, N. J.; Chakrabarty, B.; Singh, L.; Thangaraj, K. (1 March 2011). "G708E Mutation in the Androgen Receptor Results in Complete Loss of Androgen Function". Journal of Andrology. 32 (2): 193–198. doi:10.2164/jandrol.110.010736. ISSN 0196-3635. PMID 20671138.
- Rajender, Singh; Gupta, Nalini J.; Chakrabarty, Baidyanath; Singh, Lalji; Thangaraj, Kumarasamy (1 March 2009). "Ala 586 Asp mutation in androgen receptor disrupts transactivation function without affecting androgen binding". Fertility and Sterility. 91 (3): 933.e23–933.e28. doi:10.1016/j.fertnstert.2008.10.041. ISSN 0015-0282. PMID 19062009.
- Rajender, Singh; Gupta, Nalini J.; Chakrabarty, Baidyanath; Singh, Lalji; Thangaraj, Kumarasamy (11 December 2013). "L712V mutation in the androgen receptor gene causes complete androgen insensitivity syndrome due to severe loss of androgen function". Steroids. 78 (12): 1288–1292. doi:10.1016/j.steroids.2013.09.004. ISSN 0039-128X. PMID 24055831. S2CID 205255204.
- Singh, Rajender; Singh, Pooja; Gupta, Nalini J.; Chakrabarty, Baidyanath; Singh, Lalji; Thangaraj, Kumarasamy (1 November 2010). "C601S mutation in the androgen receptor results in partial loss of androgen function". The Journal of Steroid Biochemistry and Molecular Biology. 122 (5): 359–363. doi:10.1016/j.jsbmb.2010.05.006. ISSN 0960-0760. PMID 20493947. S2CID 23918339.
- Gupta, Nishi; Sudhakar, Digumarthi V. S.; Gangwar, Pravin Kumar; Sankhwar, Satya Narayan; Gupta, Nalini J.; Chakraborty, Baidyanath; Thangaraj, Kumarasamy; Gupta, Gopal; Rajender, Singh (11 September 2017). "Mutations in the prostate specific antigen (PSA/KLK3) correlate with male infertility". Scientific Reports. 7 (1): 11225. Bibcode:2017NatSR...711225G. doi:10.1038/s41598-017-10866-1. ISSN 2045-2322. PMC 5593825. PMID 28894123.
