= Ranjit Kumar Panja =

Indian politician

Member of Parliament, Lok Sabha
- In office 1998–2004
- Preceded by: Chitta Basu
- Succeeded by: Subrata Bose
- Constituency: Barasat

Personal details
- Born: 1 October 1932 Kolkata, Bengal Presidency, British India
- Died: 5 April 2006 (aged 73) Kolkata, West Bengal
- Party: Trinamool Congress
- Spouse: Krishna Panja
- Children: 1 son and daughter
- Relatives: Ajit Kumar Panja (Brother)

Dr Ranjit Kumar Panja was an Indian politician. He was elected to the Lok Sabha, the lower house of the Parliament of India from the Barasat constituency of West Bengal in 1998 and 1999 as a member of the Trinamool Congress.
