= Yusuf Pathan =

Indian cricketer and politician (born 1984)

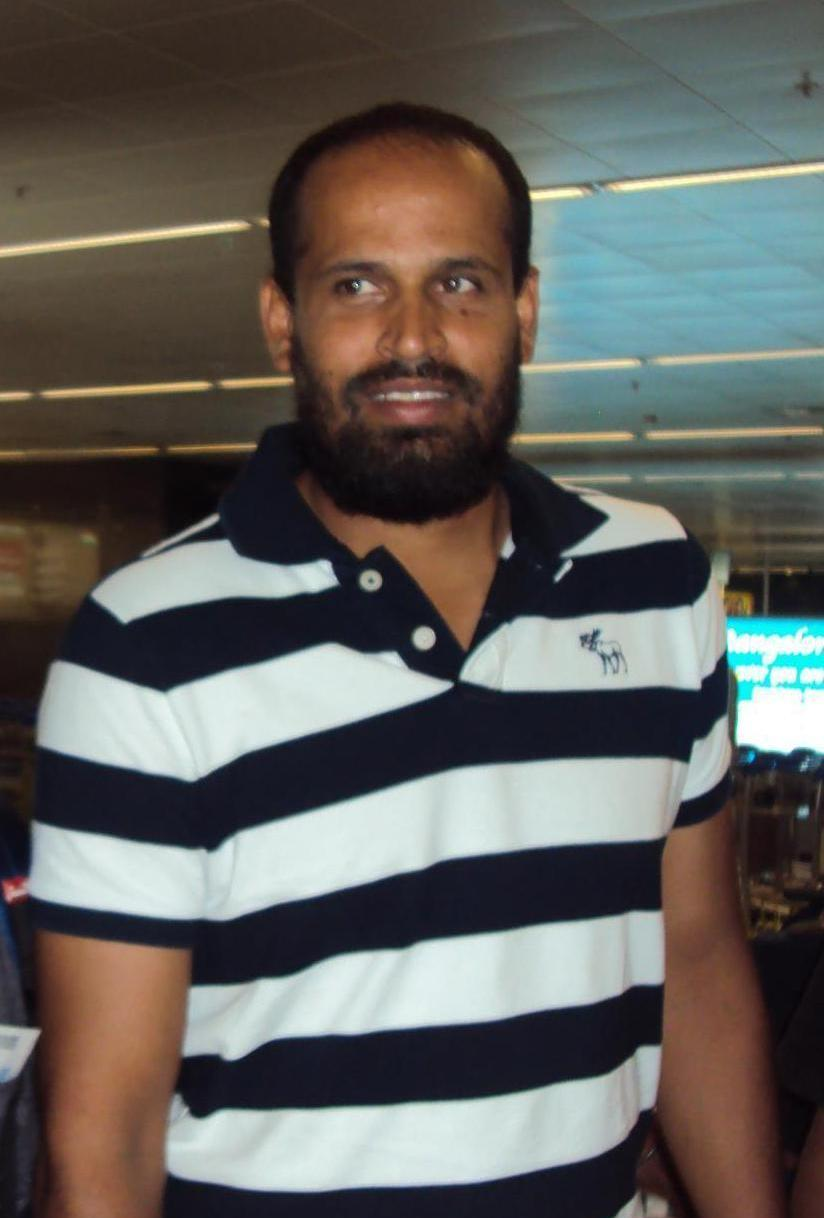
- Pathan in 2011

Member of Parliament, Lok Sabha
- Incumbent
- Assumed office 4 June 2024
- Preceded by: Adhir Ranjan Chowdhury
- Constituency: Baharampur, West Bengal
- Majority: 85,022 (6.14%)

Personal details
- Born: Yusuf Khan Pathan; 17 November 1982 (age 43) Vadodara, Gujarat, India
- Party: Nationalist Citizens Party of India (2026–present)
- Other political affiliations: All India Trinamool Congress (2024–2026)
- Height: 6 ft 2 in (188 cm)
- Spouse: Afreen Khan (m. 2013)
- Children: 2
- Relatives: Irfan Pathan (brother)
- Occupation: Politician; former cricketer
- Cricket career

Cricket information
- Batting: Right-handed
- Bowling: Right arm off break
- Role: All-rounder

International information
- National side: India (2007–2012)
- ODI debut (cap 172): 10 June 2008 v Pakistan
- Last ODI: 18 March 2012 v Pakistan
- ODI shirt no.: 28
- T20I debut (cap 18): 24 September 2007 v Pakistan
- Last T20I: 30 March 2012 v South Africa
- T20I shirt no.: 28

Domestic team information
- Years: Team
- 2001/02–2019-20: Baroda
- 2008–2010: Rajasthan Royals (squad no. 28)
- 2011–2017: Kolkata Knight Riders (squad no. 24)
- 2018–2019: Sunrisers Hyderabad (squad no. 17)

Career statistics
Competition	ODI	T20I	FC	LA
Matches	57	22	100	199
Runs scored	810	236	4,825	4,797
Batting average	27.00	18.15	34.01	33.78
100s/50s	2/3	0/0	11/20	9/28
Top score	123*	37*	210*	148
Balls bowled	1,490	305	13,384	6,034
Wickets	33	13	201	124
Bowling average	41.36	33.69	32.67	41.39
5 wickets in innings	0	0	14	2
10 wickets in match	0	0	2	0
Best bowling	3/49	2/22	6/40	5/52
Catches/stumpings	17/–	9/–	80/–	83/–
Medal record
Men's Cricket
Representing India
ICC Cricket World Cup
Winner	2011 India-Bangladesh-Sri Lanka
ICC T20 World Cup
Winner	2007 South Africa
ACC Asia Cup
Runner-up	2008 Pakistan
- Source: ESPNcricinfo, 11 January 2023

Yusuf Khan Pathan (pronounced [pəʈʰaːn] born 17 November 1982) is an Indian former cricketer and politician of the Nationalist Citizens Party of India. Pathan made his debut in first-class cricket in 2001/02 as a right-handed batsman and a right-arm off-break bowler. His younger brother, Irfan Pathan was also an Indian cricketer. Pathan retired from all forms of cricket in February 2021. He was a member of the Indian team that won both the 2007 T20 World Cup and the 2011 Cricket World Cup. As of June 2024, Pathan is a Member of Parliament from the Baharampur Lok Sabha constituency of West Bengal.

== Personal life ==
Yusuf Pathan was born in Baroda, Gujarat, to a Gujarati Pathan family. He is the elder brother of Indian cricketer Irfan Pathan. He and Irfan did philanthropic work during COVID-19 pandemic by distributing face masks.

Yusuf married Mumbai-based physiotherapist, Afreen Khan on 27 March 2013. They have a son together. He had been supporting "YAIF" and its mission "Youth Against Rape".

== Career ==
Following his impressive performances in the 2007 Deodhar Trophy and the Inter-state domestic Twenty20 competition held in April 2007, Pathan was called up for the Indian squad for the inaugural ICC World Twenty20, held in South Africa in September 2007. He made his Twenty20 international debut in the final against Pakistan. He opened the batting for India in the match, and scored 15 runs.

Following his good showing in the IPL, he was selected for the Indian one-day team. After IPL, though he played all the games in the Kitply Cup and Asia Cup, he got to bat only four times and could not perform well with either bat or ball. He was later dropped from the series against Sri Lanka. He performed well in domestic circuit and was selected for the England ODI series in November. He scored a fifty off 29 balls in the second ODI against England in Indore, on his 26th birthday.

Yusuf made his One Day International debut for India against Pakistan in Dhaka on 10 June 2008. He became a regular feature of the national One Day International team, but was not picked for the test squad.

Even though Pathan could not repeat his first IPL performance in the second season, he was selected in the Indian team to play the 2009 ICC World Twenty20 championships in England. In the second of India's Super 8 matches, he made an unbeaten 33 from 17 balls against England. Despite his knock, the team lost the game and crashed out of the tournament without making it to the semi-finals. His rare international debut came in the final of the ICC World Twenty20 in 2007.

In late 2009, Pathan was dropped from the limited overs team after a series of unproductive performances.

In the final of the 2010 Duleep Trophy cricket tournament, Pathan scored a hundred in the first innings and a double hundred in the second and led his team West Zone to a three wicket win over South Zone. Pathan made 108 in the first innings and an unbeaten 210 from 190 balls in the second innings to help his team chase down a mammoth target of 536. This became a world record for the highest successful run chase in first-class cricket history.

On 7 December 2010, Pathan's power hitting sealed a memorable 5-wicket win for India. Pathan clobbered the New Zealand attack with his aggressive innings, smashing an unbeaten 123 from 96 balls and shared an unbroken 133-run partnership with Saurabh Tiwary to guide India to a huge target of 316 with seven balls to spare and give the hosts a 4–0 lead in the series. He was named man of the match for this effort. The all-rounder clubbed seven fours and seven sixes on the way to his maiden one-day century to help the hosts overhaul New Zealand's challenging 315–7 with seven balls to spare at the M. Chinnaswamy Stadium in Bangalore.

At the awards distribution ceremony he stated that "this knock will boost my career". Indian captain Gautam Gambhir said "I have always said Pathan can finish games on his own, and that's what he did today, I had never seen something like this before. But I knew till the time Pathan was there, we would win the game."

New Zealand skipper Daniel Vettori said "It was a great game of cricket, we were in the game, but Pathan was pretty amazing and took the game away from us."

In the MTN ODI series against South Africa, before the 2011 World Cup, he gave a stand-out performance in a match in Pretoria where he scored a brilliant 105 in 70 deliveries (comprising 8 fours and 8 sixes). Even though India lost the match, his performance was complimented heavily. During this knock, he reached his century off 68 balls which is the sixth-fastest by an Indian and the second-fastest by an Indian outside the subcontinent. Thanks to his stream of good performances, he made it to the Indian team for 2011 World Cup, and also scored 100 for just 37 balls vs Mumbai Indians in IPL 2010. Though Yusuf did not have a great World Cup, he ended up having the winner's medal and the honour of holding the World Cup aloft.

He was named in the Indian team for 2012 Asia Cup to be held in Bangladesh. He featured in the triangular series in Nairobi-Kenya and played for Baroda's team against Gujarat and Kenya international.

On 27 October 2017, Pathan was charged with an anti-doping violation, having had Terbutaline detected in his urine sample following a domestic T20 match earlier in the year. On 9 January 2018, Pathan received a 5-month suspension, backdated to 15 August 2017, leaving only 5 days remaining on his suspension following its official handing down.

== Indian Premier League ==
After a good domestic season in 2007/08, he was signed by the Rajasthan Royals in the Indian Premier League for US$265,000 (INR 1.9 crore). In the 2008 IPL season, he scored 435 runs and took 8 wickets. He recorded the season's fastest half-century (from 21 balls) against the Deccan Chargers, and was also the Man of the Match in the final against the Chennai Super Kings. In May 2021, ESPNcricinfo ranked Pathan's match figures of three wickets for 22 runs, and his 56 runs from 39 balls as the greatest IPL performance in the history of the tournament.

Yusuf Pathan was named as the vice-captain of Rajasthan Royals during IPL 3. On 13 March 2010, Pathan scored a century off 37 balls, in an Indian Premier League match against Mumbai Indians. The innings also included 11 consecutive hits to the boundary (6, 6, 6, 6, 4, 4, 6, 4, 4, 4, 4).

After that knock where he scored the fastest IPL century, his Rajasthan Royals skipper Shane Warne described his innings as one of the best innings he has ever seen in his career and also compared Yusuf Pathan with his country-mate Andrew Symonds as two of the cleanest hitters of the ball.

In the 2011 IPL auction, he was bought for $2.1 million by Kolkata Knight Riders and was retained by the Kolkata Knight Riders for Rs 3.25 crores via the 'Right to Match' option in the Indian Premier League (IPL) auction 2014.

On 15 May 2013, Yusuf Pathan became the first batsman to be given out for obstructing the field in Twenty20 cricket while playing for the Kolkata Knight Riders in the IPL 2013 against Pune Warriors India.

On 24 May 2014, Yusuf hit the second-fastest 50 in IPL history doing it in a mere 15 balls. As a result, Kolkata Knight Riders ended up 2nd in the league table and won the title for the season.

In January 2018, he was bought by the Sunrisers Hyderabad in the 2018 IPL auction. He played multiple good knocks that season including a vital 45 vs Chennai Super Kings in the final, though it was in a losing cause. After a dip in form in the 2019 season, he was released by Hyderabad ahead of the 2020 IPL auction.

=== Other leagues ===
Yusuf Pathan plays for Bhilwara Kings in the Legends League Cricket.He has also played for TMC in the year 2024 for Men's National Cricket & Politics League

== Domestic cricket ==
He held the record of fastest 50 (in 18 balls) up to October 2015 in the Ranji Trophy. His record was broken by Bandeep Singh (in 15 balls).

== Cricket Academy of Pathans ==
The Cricket Academy of Pathans was jointly launched by Yusuf and Irfan Pathan. The academy has tied up with former India coach Greg Chappell and Cameron Tradell as chief mentors. They also appointed Huzaifa Pathan as a coach for the academy. Chappell coached the coaches of the academy.

== Political career ==
Pathan contested in the 2024 Indian general election from the Baharampur Lok Sabha constituency on a Trinamool Congress ticket and won, defeating incumbent Adhir Ranjan Chowdhury of Indian National Congress by a margin of 85,022 votes.

=== 2026 rebellion ===
In June 2026, almost immediately after the massive Trinamool Congress defeat, around 20 MPs of TMC including Yusuf Pathan, Saayoni Ghosh, Shatrughan Sinha, Bapi Halder, Mala Roy, Mitali Bag, Deepak Adhikari, Arup Chakraborty, Sharmila Sarkar, Satabdi Roy, Rachna Banerjee, Prasun Banerjee and others, allegedly declared rebellion from their Party, and presented their written wish to join Bharatiya Janata Party. This group was led by Kakoli Ghosh Dastidar.

Later, on 14 June 20 MPs, including Pathan, signed a formal letter declaring their split from Trinamool Congress as to merge with the Nationalist Citizen Party of India (NCPI). They formally submitted the letter to Lok Sabha Speaker Om Birla.

The total strength of TMC in Lok Sabha had been 28, so that a number of 20 MPS made it eligible for splitting from the Party, as per the Indian Defection laws, so as to escape the anti-defection disqualification.
