= Sudarshan Ghosh Dastidar =

Indian politician

Minister for Environmental Affairs, Government of West Bengal
- In office 20 May 2011 – 20 May 2016
- Governor: M. K. Narayanan
- Succeeded by: Sovan Chatterjee

Member of West Bengal Legislative Assembly
- In office 13 May 2011 – 4 May 2021
- Preceded by: Tamalika Seth
- Succeeded by: Tilak Kumar Chakraborty
- Constituency: Mahisadal

Personal details
- Born: 8 November 1952 (age 73)
- Party: Nationalist Citizens Party of India
- Other political affiliations: Mamata All India Trinamool Congress
- Spouse: Kakoli Ghosh Dastidar
- Children: 2 sons

Sudarshan Ghosh Dastidar is an Indian doctor and a former Indian politician and the Minister for Environmental Affairs in the Government of West Bengal. He was also an MLA, elected from the Mahisadal constituency in the 2011 West Bengal state assembly election.

His wife, Kakoli Ghosh Dastidar, a gynecologist, has been involved in active politics under the stewardship of Trinamool Congress leader and Chief Minister of West Bengal, Mamata Banerjee. She is an elected member of the 15th, 16th and 17th Lok Sabha from Barasat in West Bengal and the Deputy Leader of the Trinamool in Lok Sabha. Before his recent induction into state politics he has been known as one of the leading infertility practitioners in India since 1981. He is widely recognized as one of the pioneers in test tube baby research in the country.

== Education ==
Dr. Sudarsan Ghosh Dastidar received his MBBS degree and also his M.D. in Obstetrics and Gynecology from R. G. Kar Medical College and Hospital. He subsequently visited several advanced centres for training such as Cornell University/Weil Medical Centre, New York, and the Albert Einstein Institute in the United States of America, Erasmus University, Netherlands. He met Prof. Robert Edwards and went to Bourne Hall Clinic in Cambridge for training.

== Initiation into research ==
Dr. Sudarsan Ghosh Dastidar was a beloved student of late Dr. Subhas Mukhopadhyay who was successful in delivering India's first test tube baby in 1978, the same year that Dr. Robert Edwards and Patrick Steptoe delivered the world's first IVF baby in Cambridge, England. His novel work however met with intense criticism from the medical community since his work was not ideally documented in terms of micro-photographic evidence of the program and others. He tragically took his life. After his tragic demise Dr. Ghosh Dastidar and Dr. B. Chakravarty jointly developed a successful IVF program in Kolkata which gave birth to India's first IVF boy in 1986.

== Research and career ==
Their program was successful in delivering Imran, India's second test-tube baby by IVF in 1986, which created a stir and was widely covered in the press. Before that they were successful in achieving pregnancies by IUI and reported it in the 3rd World Congress on IVF, Helsinki, Finland in 1984. In 1991 Dr. Ghosh Dastidar independently established Calcutta's second test tube baby program called Infertility Clinic and IVF Centre in Gariahat, Calcutta which is credited with the birth of India's first test-tube baby by ICSI technology, widely considered to be the biggest advancement in infertility research since IVF in 1978. In 2005 Asia's first baby by IVF-Surrogacy to a single father was born under his treatment. He has delivered lectures and presented his research all over the world. In 2007 he established his centre Ghosh Dastidar Institute for Fertility Research in Bhawanipur, Kolkata. In 2011 his centre was selected by the International Society for Mild Approaches in Assisted Reproduction (ISMAAR) to host the 4th World Congress on Mild Approaches in Assisted Reproduction in Kolkata. This was the first time that a World Congress in IVF-ART was held in India.

== Memberships ==
Ghosh Dastidar was invited by the Ministry of Health and Family Welfare, Government of India to be on the National Expert Advisory Panel on IVF formed by the ICMR (Indian Council for Medical Research) to draft guidelines to regulate, accredit and supervise IVF centers in India. He is the only member from India of the International Task Force for IVF in third World Countries constituted by The European Society for Human Reproduction and Embryology (ESHRE). He is also a member of the American Society for Reproductive Medicine (ASRM).

== Family ==
His wife Kakoli Ghosh Dastidar is an expert in Doppler and 3-Dimensional Ultrasound and specializes in imaging for reproductive medicine. She is an active member of their Institute and its research program. She is also a Member of Parliament from Barasat Lok Sabha constituency in West Bengal. They have two sons both of whom are doctors.
