= Cricket Academy of Pathans =

Cricket academy in Vadodara, India

The Cricket Academy of Pathans is a cricket academy in Vadodara, Gujarat. The academy was jointly launched by Irfan Pathan and Yusuf Pathan. The academy has former India coach Greg Chappell and Cameron Tradell as its chief mentors. Chappell would coach the coaches of the academy.

Academies are located in the following cities:

- Rohini & Dwarka (Delhi)
- Noida, Lucknow & Mainpuri (U.P)
- Patna (Bihar)
- Ranchi (Jharkhand)
- Hisar (Haryana)
- Ludhiana & Sangrur (Punjab)
- Morbi, Lunavada & Rajkot (Gujarat)
- Kota & Jaipur (Rajasthan)
- Akola, Pune & Shrirampur (Maharashtra)
- Bengaluru, Mysore (Karnataka)
- Hyderabad (Telangana)
