= Tilak Kumar Chakraborty =

Indian politician

Tilak Kumar Chakraborty (born 1966) is an Indian politician from West Bengal. He is a member of the West Bengal Legislative Assembly from Mahisadal Assembly constituency in Purba Medinipur district. He won the 2021 West Bengal Legislative Assembly election representing the All India Trinamool Congress party.

== Early life and education ==
Chakraborty is from Mahisadal, Purba Medinipur district, West Bengal. He is the son of Bhabaniprasad Chakraborty. He completed his BCom in 1988 at Mahishadal Raj College which is affiliated with Vidyasagar University. He runs his own business and his wife works in a primary school.

== Career ==
Chakraborty won from Mahisadal Assembly constituency representing the All India Trinamool Congress in the 2021 West Bengal Legislative Assembly election. He polled 101,986 votes and defeated his nearest rival, Biswanath Banerjee of the Bharatiya Janata Party, by a margin of 2,386 votes.
