= Barasat Lok Sabha constituency =

Lok Sabha Constituency in West Bengal

Coordinates: 22°43′N 88°29′E

Barasat WB-17
- Lok Sabha constituency
- Interactive Map Outlining Barasat Lok Sabha Constituency

Constituency details
- Country: India
- Region: East India
- State: West Bengal
- Assembly constituencies: Habra; Ashoknagar; Rajarhat New Town; Bidhannagar; Madhyamgram; Barasat; Deganga
- Established: 1952-present
- Total electors: 1,512,792
- Reservation: None

Member of Parliament
- 18th Lok Sabha
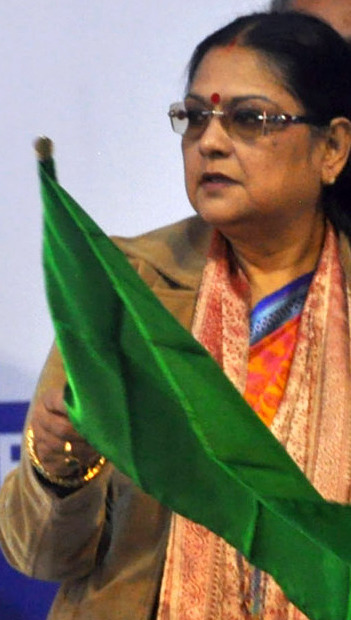
- Incumbent Kakoli Ghosh Dastidar
- Party: NCPI
- Alliance: NDA
- Elected year: 2024

Barasat Lok Sabha constituency is one of the 543 parliamentary constituencies in India. The constituency centres on Barasat in West Bengal. All the seven assembly segments of No. 17 Barasat Lok Sabha constituency are in North 24 Parganas district.

Most Successful parties from Barasat Lok Sabha
1. All India Forward Bloc (6 times) 35.29 (33.3%)
2. Trinamool Congress (6 times) 35.29 (33.3%)
3. Indian National Congress (4 times) 23.53 (22.2%)
4. Communist Party of India (2 times) 11.76 (11.1%)

== Assembly segments ==
Parliamentary constituencies in West Bengal - 1. Cooch Behar, 2. Alipurduars, 3. Jalpaiguri, 4. Darjeeling, 5. Raiganj, 6. Balurghat, 7. Maldaha Uttar, 8. Maldaha Dakshin, 9. Jangipur, 10. Baharampur, 11. Murshidabad, 12. Krishnanagar, 13. Ranaghat, 14. Bangaon, 15. Barrackpore, 16. Dum Dum, 17. Barasat, 18. Basirhat, 19. Jaynagar, 20. Mathurapur, 21. Diamond Harbour, 22. Jadavpur, 23. Kolkata Dakshin, 24. Kolkata Uttar, 25. Howrah, 26. Uluberia, 27. Serampore, 28. Hooghly, 29. Arambagh, 30. Tamluk, 31, Kanthi, 32. Ghatal, 33. Jhargram, 34. Medinipur, 35. Purulia, 36. Bankura, 37. Bishnupur, 38. Bardhaman Purba, 39. Bardhaman Durgapur, 40. Asansol, 41. Bolpur, 42. Birbhum

As per order of the Delimitation Commission in respect of the delimitation of constituencies in the West Bengal, parliamentary constituency no. 17 Barasat is composed of the following Assembly segments from 2009:

#	Name	District	Member	Party	2024 Lead
100	Habra	North 24 Parganas	Debdas Mondal	BJP	BJP
101	Ashoknagar	North 24 Parganas	Sumay Hira	BJP	AITC
115	Rajarhat New Town	North 24 Parganas	Piyush Kanodia	BJP	AITC
116	Bidhannagar	North 24 Parganas	Sharadwat Mukherjee	BJP	BJP
118	Madhyamgram	North 24 Parganas	Rathin Ghosh	AITC	AITC
119	Barasat	North 24 Parganas	Shankar Chatterjee	BJP	AITC
120	Deganga	North 24 Parganas	Anisur Rahaman	AITC	AITC

== Members of Parliament ==
Year	Member	Party
1952	Arun Chandra Guha	Indian National Congress
1957	Arun Chandra Guha	Indian National Congress
1962	Arun Chandra Guha	Indian National Congress
1967	Ranen Sen	Communist Party of India
1971	Ranen Sen	Communist Party of India
1977	Chitta Basu	All India Forward Bloc
1980	Chitta Basu	All India Forward Bloc
1984	Tarun Kanti Ghosh	Indian National Congress
1989	Chitta Basu	All India Forward Bloc
1991	Chitta Basu	All India Forward Bloc
1996	Chitta Basu	All India Forward Bloc
1998	Ranjit Kumar Panja	Trinamool Congress
1999	Ranjit Kumar Panja	Trinamool Congress
2004	Subrata Bose	All India Forward Bloc
2009	Kakoli Ghosh Dastidar	Trinamool Congress
2014	Kakoli Ghosh Dastidar	Trinamool Congress
2019	Kakoli Ghosh Dastidar	Trinamool Congress
2024	Kakoli Ghosh Dastidar	Trinamool Congress
2026 (Note: Switched to NCPI as part of AITC Rebels in Lok Sabha.)	Kakoli Ghosh Dastidar	Nationalist Citizens Party of India

== Election results ==
=== General election 2024 ===
2024 Indian general election: Barasat
Party	Candidate	Votes	%	±%
AITC	Kakoli Ghosh Dastidar	692,010	45.15	▼1.32
BJP	Swapan Majumder	577,823	37.70	▼0.87
AISF	Tapas Banerjee	121,440	7.92	▲7.92
AIFB	Sanjib Chatterjee	100,000	6.52	▼2.37
NOTA	None of the above	17,892	1.17	
Majority		114,189		
Turnout		1,532,601		
AITC hold		Swing		

=== General election 2019 ===
2019 Indian general elections: Barasat
Party	Candidate	Votes	%	±%
AITC	Kakoli Ghosh Dastidar	648,444	46.47	+5.08
BJP	Dr. Mrinal Kanti Debnath	538,275	38.57	+15.2
AIFB	Haripada Biswas	124,068	8.89	−18.86
INC	Subrata Dutta	37,277	2.67	−0.53
NOTA	None of the above	17,769	1.27	
Majority		110,169	7.90	−5.74
Turnout		1,396,194	81.26	−2.65
AITC hold		Swing		

=== General elections 2014 ===
2014 Indian general elections: Barasat
Party	Candidate	Votes	%	±%
AITC	Kakoli Ghosh Dastidar	525,387	41.39	−9.56
AIFB	Mortaza Hossain	3,52,246	27.75	−11.22
BJP	P. C. Sorcar, Jr.	2,96,608	23.37	+17.97
INC	Riju Ghoshal	40,660	3.20	+3.20
None of the Above	None of the Above	12,700	1.00	
BSP	Sukumar Bala	12,178	0.96	
Majority		1,73,141	13.64	+1.66
Turnout		12,69,331	83.91	
AITC hold		Swing	-10.39	

=== General election 2009 ===
2009 Indian general elections: Barasat
Party	Candidate	Votes	%	±%
AITC	Kakoli Ghosh Dastidar	522,530	50.96	
AIFB	Sudin Chattopadhyay	3,99,629	38.97	
BJP	Bratin Sengupta	55,353	5.39	
BSP	Arun Kumar Biswas	18,381	1.79	
AUDF	Bhaskar Ghosh	9,161	0.89	
IND	Kumari Kamala Das	7,527	0.73	
Majority		1,22,901	11.99	
Turnout		10,25,329	83.60	
AITC gain from AIFB		Swing		

2009 Indian general election West Bengal summary
Party	Seats won	Seat change	Vote percentage
Trinamool Congress	19	▲18	31.8
Indian National Congress	6	▲0	13.45
Socialist Unity Centre of India (Communist)	1	▲1	NA
Communist Party of India (Marxist)	9	▼17	33.1
Communist Party of India	2	▼1	3.6
Revolutionary Socialist Party	2	▼1	3.56
Forward bloc	2	▼1	3.04
Bharatiya Janata Party	1	▲1	6.14

=== General elections 1957-2004 ===
Most of the contests were multi-cornered. However, only winners and runners-up are mentioned below:

Year	Voters	Voter turnout	Winner			Runners up		
		%age	Candidate	%age	Party	Candidate	%age	Party
1957	273525	56.56	Arun Chandra Guha	51.10	Indian National Congress	Bhowani Sankar Sen Gupta	48.90	Communist Party of India
1962	385,859	59.64	Arun Chandra Guha	50.17	Indian National Congress	Bhowani Sankar Sen Gupta	37.70	Communist Party of India
1967	365,429	74.09	Ranendra Nath Sen	40.84	Communist Party of India	Arun Chandra Guha	31.59	Indian National Congress
1971	349,894	64.10	Ranendra Nath Sen	33.29	Communist Party of India	Hemanta Gangopadhyay	30.54	Communist Party of India (Marxist)
1977	372,420	61.05	Chitta Basu	56.15	Forward Bloc	Ranen Sen	24.23	Communist Party of India
1980	571,760	75.33	Chitta Basu	53.03	Forward Bloc	Harasit Ghosh	36.30	Indian National Congress (I)
1984	703,870	83-83	Tarun Kanti Ghosh	49.46	Indian National Congress	Chitta Basu	47.64	Forward Bloc
1989	898,100	85.87	Chitta Basu	50.52	Forward Bloc	Tarun Kanti Ghosh	44.38	Indian National Congress
1991	893, 570	83.11	Chitta Basu	43.60	Forward Bloc	Ashok Krishna Dutt	35.84	Indian National Congress
1996	1,072,010	86.33	Chitta Basu	46.24	Forward Bloc	Dr. Ranjit Kumar Panja	42.86	Indian National Congress
1998	1,070,950	84.10	Dr. Ranjit Kumar Panja	47.13	Trinamool Congress	Chitra Ghosh	40.83	Forward Bloc
1999	1,043,590	80.88	Dr. Ranjit Kumar Panja	50.28	Trinamool Congress	Saral Deb	40.88	Forward Bloc
2004	1,153,580	83.11	Subrata Bose	45.13	Forward Bloc	Dr. Ranjit Kumar Panja	44.07	Trinamool Congress

== See also ==
- Barasat
- List of constituencies of the Lok Sabha
