= Rahima Mondal =

Indian politician

Member of the West Bengal Legislative Assembly
- In office 30 May 2016 – 4 May 2026
- Preceded by: M. Nuruzzaman
- Succeeded by: Anisur Rahaman
- Constituency: Deganga

Personal details
- Party: All India Trinamool Congress

Rahima Mondal is an Indian politician. She was elected to the West Bengal Legislative Assembly from Deganga as a member of the All India Trinamool Congress.
