= Tarun Kanti Ghosh =

Indian politician

Member of Parliament, Lok Sabha
- In office 1984-1989
- Preceded by: Chitta Basu
- Succeeded by: Chitta Basu
- Constituency: Barasat, West Bengal

Personal details
- Party: Indian National Congress

Tarun Kanti Ghosh is an Indian politician. He was elected to the Lok Sabha, the lower house of the Parliament of India from the Barasat constituency of West Bengal in 1984 as a member of the Indian National Congress.
