= Chitta Basu (politician) =

Indian politician (1926–1997)

General Secretary of All India Forward Bloc
- In office 19 March 1979 – 5 October 1997
- Preceded by: R. K. Haldulkar
- Succeeded by: Debabrata Biswas

Member of parliament, Lok Sabha for Barasat
- In office 1989 – 5 October 1997
- Preceded by: Tarun Kanti Ghosh
- Succeeded by: Ranjit Kumar Panja
- In office 1977–1984
- Preceded by: Ranendranath Sen
- Succeeded by: Tarun Kanti Ghosh

Member of the West Bengal Legislative Assembly for Barasat
- In office 1957–1962
- Preceded by: Amulyadhan Mukhopadhyay
- Succeeded by: H. K. Basu

Personal details
- Born: 25 December 1926 Dacca, Bengal Presidency, British India
- Died: 5 October 1997 (aged 70) Bihar, India
- Party: Forward Bloc
- Education: University of Calcutta

Chitta Basu (25 December 1926 – 5 October 1997) was an Indian politician and a leader of the All India Forward Bloc. He served as the General Secretary of the party from 1979 till his death in 1997. In his obituary, The Indian Express described Basu as belonging to the rare tribe of politicians who did politics for a cause and practiced what they preached. Barasat was his Indian Parliamentary constituency for over two decades.

== Education ==
Basu graduated from Daulatpur College in Khulna district (British India). He later earned his master's from the University of Calcutta.

== Political life ==
Chitta Basu joined the Forward Bloc formed by Subhas Chandra Bose in 1939, after Bose resigned from the Indian National Congress. Basu worked for the party since he had joined it as a promising student leader in 1945. He rose to become the party's youth wing, All-India Yuba League's general secretary in 1947–48. After India's partition, Basu immersed himself in refugee rehabilitation work. In 1972, he became the party's central committee member and then the general secretary in March 1979, after the 10th Party Congress succeeding R. K. Haldulkar, a post that he held until his death.

In 1957, Basu was first elected to the West Bengal state legislative assembly from Barasat of the then undivided 24 Parganas district. In 1966, he became a member of the Rajya Sabha. He was elected to the 6th Lok Sabha from Barasat constituency in 1977, before getting re-elected in 1980, 1989, 1991 and 1996 from the same constituency. In 1996, he became a member of the United Front steering committee.

Basu was one of the All India Forward Bloc leaders who struggled for the party's survival immediately after independence; other political parties (particularly Left and a section of Indian socialists) abused the Forward Bloc over Bose's alliance with the Axis.

== Death ==
Basu died of a cardiac arrest on the Howrah-bound Danapur Express between Madhupur and Jasidih railway stations in Bihar in the early morning of 5 October 1997. He was returning to Calcutta after attending an anti-Lalu Prasad Yadav rally organised by a 17-party left and democratic front in Patna. Travelling alone in an AC first class coupe, he complained of abdominal pain to a railway attendant soon after the train left Patna. Soon, a wireless message was sent to the Jhajha station, where he complained of chest pain before he was examined and given medication. He was found dead at around 2:30 a.m. (IST) when doctors boarded the train to check his condition at the Madhupur station.

== See also ==
- Indian independence movement
