= Deganga Assembly constituency =

Assembly constituency in West Bengal, India

Deganga
- Constituency No. 120 for the West Bengal Legislative Assembly
- Interactive Map Outlining Deganga Assembly Constituency

Constituency details
- Country: India
- Region: East India
- State: West Bengal
- District: North 24 Parganas
- Lok Sabha constituency: Barasat
- Established: 1951
- Total electors: 2,40,229 (2026)
- Reservation: None

Member of Legislative Assembly
- 18th West Bengal Legislative Assembly
- Incumbent Anisur Rahaman Bidesh
- Party: Mamata All IndiaTrinamool Congress
- Elected year: 2026
- Preceded by: Rahima Mondal

Deganga Assembly constituency is an assembly constituency in North 24 Parganas district in the Indian state of West Bengal.

== Overview ==
As per orders of the Delimitation Commission, No. 120 Deganga Assembly constituency is composed of the following: Kadambagachhi and Katra gram panchayats of Barasat I community development block, and Amulia, Berachampa I, Berachampa II, Chakla, Chaurasi, Hadipur Jhikra I, Kalsur, Nur Nagar and Sohai-Shwetpur gram panchayats of Deganga community development block.

Deganga Assembly constituency is part of No. 17 Barasat (Lok Sabha constituency).

== Members of the Legislative Assembly ==
Year	Name	Party
1951	Rafiuddin Ahmed	Indian National Congress
1957	Rafiuddin Ahmed	Indian National Congress
1957	Atul Krishna Roy	Indian National Congress
1962	Maulana Bazlur Rahman Durgapuri	Indian National Congress
1967	J. Kabir	Bangla Congress
1969	Harun-Or-Rashid	Progressive Muslim League
1971	Harun-Or-Rashid	Progressive Muslim League
1972	M. Shaukat Ali	Indian National Congress
1977	A. K. M. Hassan Uzzaman	Indian Union Muslim League
1982	Mortaza Hossain	All India Forward Bloc
1987	A. K. M. Hassan Uzzaman	Indian Union Muslim League
1991	Md. Yakub	All India Forward Bloc
1996	Md. Yakub	All India Forward Bloc
2001	Md. Yakub	All India Forward Bloc
2006	Mortaza Hossain	All India Forward Bloc
2011	Dr. Nuruzjjaman	All India Trinamool Congress
2016	Rahima Mondal	All India Trinamool Congress
2021	Rahima Mondal	All India Trinamool Congress
2026	Anisur Rahaman Bidesh	All India Trinamool Congress

== Election results ==
=== 2026 ===
2026 West Bengal Legislative Assembly election: Deganga
Party	Candidate	Votes	%	±%
AITC	Anisur Rahaman Bidesh	101,114	43.31	▼3.39
Indian Secular Front	Mafidul Haque Sahaji (Mintu)	83,296	35.68	▲4.16
BJP	Tarun Kanti Ghosh	41,726	17.87	▼0.06
NOTA	None of the above	2,318	0.99	▲0.01
Majority		17,818	7.63	▼7.55
Turnout		233,473	97.19	▲8.84
AITC hold		Swing		

=== 2021 ===
2021 West Bengal Legislative Assembly election: Deganga
Party	Candidate	Votes	%	±%
AITC	Rahima Mondal	100,105	46.7	
Indian Secular Front	Karim Ali	67,568	31.52	
BJP	Dipika Chatterjee	38,446	17.93	
AIFB	Md. Hasanoor Jaman Chowdhury	2,942	1.37	
NOTA	None of the above	2,100	0.98	
Majority		32,537	15.18	
Turnout		214,380	88.35	
AITC hold		Swing		

=== 2016 ===
West Bengal assembly elections, 2016: Deganga constituency
Party	Candidate	Votes	%	±%
AITC	Rahima Mondal	97,412	50.87	+1.48
AIFB	Md. Hasanoor Jaman Chowdhury	71,422	37.29	−1.20
BJP	Tarun Kanti Ghosh	12,074	6.30	−1.01
BSP	Baki Billah Karikar	3,562	2.22	−0.02
WPOI	Rafikul Islam	2,317	1.21	
SUCI(C)	Ajoy Sadhukhan	1,754	0.92	
NOTA	None of the above	1,589	0.83	
LJP	Rita Panda	694	0.36	
Turnout		191,509	88.75	−1.55
AITC hold		Swing		

=== 2011 ===
West Bengal assembly elections, 2011: Deganga constituency
Party	Candidate	Votes	%	±%
AITC	Dr Nuruzjjaman	78,395	49.39	+11.84
AIFB	Dr. Mortaza Hossain	61,095	38.49	−8.89
BJP	Tarun Kanti Ghosh	11,606	7.31	
BSP	Roushan Ali	3,562	2.24	
Paschim Banga Rajya Muslim League	Kausar Ali Mullick	1,708		
Independent	Bhaskar Ghosh	1,369		
Independent	Abdul Ahed Molla	979		
Turnout		158,714	90.3	
AITC gain from AIFB		Swing	20.73	

=== 2006 ===
In the 2006 state assembly elections, Dr. Mortoza Hossain of AIFB won the Deganga assembly seat defeating Mafidul Haque Sahaji of AITC. Contests in most years were multi cornered but only winners and runners are being mentioned. Md. Yakub of Forward Bloc defeated Abdur Rouf of Trinamool Congress in 2001, Idris Ali of Congress in 1996, and Ashanullah of Congress in 1991. A.K.M. Hassan Uzzaman of IUML defeated Dr. Mortoza Hossain of Forward Bloc in 1987. Dr. Mortoza Hossain of Forward Bloc defeated A.K.M. Hassan Uzzaman of IUML in 1982. A.K.M. Hassan Uzzaman of IUML defeated Md. Yakub of Forward Bloc in 1977.

=== 1972 ===
M. Shaukat Ali of Congress won in 1972. Harun-Or-Rashid Independent/Progressive Muslim League won in 1971 and 1969. J.Kabir of Bangla Congress won in 1967. Maulana Bazlur Rahman Durgapuri of Congress won in 1962. Rafiuddin Ahmed and Atul Krishna Roy, both of Congress, won the Deganaga joint seat in 1957. In independent India's first election in 1951, Rafiuddin Ahmed of Congress won the Deganga seat.
