= Kasba Assembly constituency =

Kasba Assembly constituency may refer to:

- Kasba, Bihar Assembly constituency
- Kasba, West Bengal Assembly constituency
- Kasba Peth Assembly constituency in Maharashtra
