= Subrata Bose =

Indian politician (1932–2016)

Member of Parliament, Lok Sabha
- In office 2004–2009
- Preceded by: Dr. Ranjit Kumar Panja
- Succeeded by: Kakoli Ghosh Dastidar
- Constituency: Barasat

MLA
- In office 2001–2004
- Preceded by: Santi Ranjan Ganguly
- Succeeded by: Jiban Prakash Saha
- Constituency: Shyampukur

Personal details
- Born: 25 February 1932 Calcutta, Bengal Presidency, British India
- Died: 20 January 2016 (aged 83) Kolkata, West Bengal, India
- Party: AIFB
- Spouse: Nandita Bose
- Children: 2 daughters
- As of 17 September, 2006

Subrata Bose (25 February 1932 – 20 January 2016) was an Indian politician, and a member of the 14th Lok Sabha. He represented the Barasat constituency of West Bengal and was a member of the All India Forward Bloc political party.

He graduated in arts from the Scottish Church College at the University of Calcutta in 1952. He died after a cardiac arrest at his residence on 20 January 2016.
