= Anisur Rahaman Bidesh =

Indian politician (born 1988)

- আনিসুর রহমান বিদেশ

Member of West Bengal Legislative Assembly
- Incumbent
- Assumed office 4 May 2026
- Preceded by: Rahima Mondal
- Constituency: Deganga

Personal details
- Citizenship: Indian
- Party: All India Trinamool Congress (until 2026); Mamata All India Trinamool Congress (from 2026)
- Profession: Politician

Anisur Rahaman Bidesh (born 1988) is an Indian politician from West Bengal. He is a member of the West Bengal Legislative Assembly from the Deganga Assembly constituency in North 24 Parganas district representing the Mamata All India Trinamool Congress.

== Early life and education ==
Bidesh is from Deganga, North 24 Parganas district, West Bengal. He is the son of the late Sirajul Islam. He completed his Bachelor in Arts at Chandraketugarh Sahidullah Smriti Mahavidyalaya which is affiliated with University of Calcutta in 2011. He runs his own business. He declared assets worth Rs.18 crores in his affidavit to the Election Commission of India.

== Career ==
Bidesh won the Deganga Assembly constituency representing the All India Trinamool Congress in the 2026 West Bengal Legislative Assembly election. He polled 1,01,114 votes and defeated his nearest rival, Md Mofidul Hoque Sahaji of the All India Secular Front, by a margin of 17,818 votes.
