= Mahisadal Assembly constituency =

Mahisadal
- Constituency No. 208 for the West Bengal Legislative Assembly
- Interactive Map Outlining Mahisadal Assembly Constituency

Constituency details
- Country: India
- Region: East India
- State: West Bengal
- District: Purba Medinipur
- Lok Sabha constituency: Tamluk
- Established: 1951
- Total electors: 189,794
- Reservation: None

Member of Legislative Assembly
- 18th West Bengal Legislative Assembly
- Incumbent Subhas Chandra Panja
- Party: BJP
- Alliance: NDA
- Elected year: 2026

Mahisadal Assembly constituency is an assembly constituency in Purba Medinipur district in the Indian state of West Bengal.

== Overview ==
As per orders of the Delimitation Commission, No. 208 Mahisadal Assembly constituency is composed of the following: Mahishadal and Haldia community development blocks.

Mahisadal Assembly constituency is part of No. 30 Tamluk (Lok Sabha constituency).

== Members of the Legislative Assembly ==
| Year | Name | Party |
|---|---|---|
| 1952 | Kumar Deba Prosad Garga | Independent politician |
| 1957 | Mahtab Chandra Das | Indian National Congress |
| 1957 | Prafulla Chandra Ghosh | Praja Socialist Party |
| 1962 | Sushil Kumar Dhara | Bangla Congress |
| 1967 | Sushil Kumar Dhara | Bangla Congress |
| 1969 | Sushil Kumar Dhara | Bangla Congress |
| 1971 | Sushil Kumar Dhara | Bangla Congress |
| 1972 | Ahindra Mishra | Indian National Congress |
| 1977 | Saswati Bag | Janata Party |
| 1982 | Dinabandhu Mondal | Communist Party of India |
| 1987 | Surya Chakraborty | Communist Party of India |
| 1991 | Sukumar Das | Indian National Congress |
| 1996 | Sukumar Das | Indian National Congress |
| 2001 | Dipak Kumar Ghosh | All India Trinamool Congress |
| 2006 | Tamalika Panda Seth | Communist Party of India |
| 2011 | Sudarshan Ghosh Dastidar | All India Trinamool Congress |
| 2016 | Sudarshan Ghosh Dastidar | All India Trinamool Congress |
| 2021 | Tilak Kumar Chakraborty | All India Trinamool Congress |
| 2026 | Subhas Chandra Panja | Bharatiya Janata Party |

== Election results ==
=== 2026 ===
2026 West Bengal Legislative Assembly election: Mahisadal
| Party | Candidate | Votes | % | ±% |
|---|---|---|---|---|
| BJP | Subhas Chandra Panja | 121,584 | 51.05 | +5.64 |
| AITC | Tilak Kumar Chakraborty | 95,346 | 40.03 | −6.46 |
| CPI(M) | Paritosh Pattanayak | 11,490 | 4.82 | |
| Jatiya Unnayan Party | Swarnakamal Das | 5,603 | 2.35 | |
| NOTA | None of the above | 843 | 0.35 | −0.45 |
| Majority | | 26,238 | 11.02 | +9.94 |
| Turnout | | 238,188 | 93.87 | +4.43 |
| BJP hold | | Swing | 6.05 | |

=== 2021 ===
2021 West Bengal Legislative Assembly election: Mahisadal
| Party | Candidate | Votes | % | ±% |
|---|---|---|---|---|
| AITC | Tilak Kumar Chakraborty | 101,986 | 46.49 | |
| BJP | Biswanath Banerjee | 99,600 | 45.41 | |
| Indian Secular Front | Bikram Chatterjee | 13,796 | 6.29 | |
| NOTA | None of the above | 1,765 | 0.8 | |
| Majority | | 2,386 | 1.08 | |
| Turnout | | 219,355 | 89.44 | |
| AITC hold | | Swing | | |

=== 2016 ===
West Bengal assembly elections, 2016: Mahisadal
| Party | Candidate | Votes | % | ±% |
|---|---|---|---|---|
| AITC | Dr. Sudarshan Ghosh Dastidar | 94,827 | 48.10 | −7.19 |
| Independent | Dr. Subrata Maiti | 78,118 | 39.82 | |
| BJP | Prasenjit Samanta | 14,150 | 7.18 | +3.84 |
| Bharat Nirman Party | Tapan Kumar Banerjee | 2,832 | 1.44 | |
| NOTA | None of the above | 2,025 | 1.03 | |
| Independent | Subrata Maity | 1,918 | 0.97 | |
| PDS | Sukumar Chaulya | 1,362 | 0.69 | |
| SUCI(C) | Tapan Maity | 1,048 | 0.53 | |
| LJP | Maslema Begam | 866 | 0.44 | |
| Turnout | | 197,146 | 89.07 | −2.08 |
| AITC hold | | Swing | | |

Dr. Subrata Maiti, contesting as an independent candidate, was supported by the Left - Congress Alliance.

=== 2011 ===
In the 2011 elections, Dr.Sudarshan Ghosh Dastidar of Trinamool Congress defeated his nearest rival Tamalika Panda Seth of CPI(M).

West Bengal assembly elections, 2011: Mahisadal
| Party | Candidate | Votes | % | ±% |
|---|---|---|---|---|
| AITC | Dr. Sudarshan Ghosh Dastidar | 95,640 | 55.29 | +5.49# |
| CPI(M) | Tamalika Panda Seth | 67,478 | 39.01 | −9.98 |
| BJP | Prasenjit Samanta | 5,783 | 3.34 | |
| People’s Democratic Conference of India | Sk. Ajad Ali | 1,875 | | |
| Independent | Keramat Baks Mallik | 1,436 | | |
| PDS | Sukumar Chaulya | 78 | | |
| Turnout | | 172,994 | 91.15 | |
| AITC gain from CPI(M) | | Swing | 15.47# | |

Tamalika Panda Seth, the contesting CPIM candidate From Mahisadal, is wife of the CPI(M) strongman Lakshman Chandra Seth.

.# Swing calculated on Congress+Trinamool Congress vote percentages taken together in 2006.

=== 2006 ===
In the 2006 state assembly elections Tamalika Panda Seth of CPI(M) won the 204 Mahisadal assembly seat defeating her nearest rival Buddhadeb Bhowmick of Trinamool Congress. Contests in most years were multi cornered but only winners and runners are being mentioned. Dipak Kumar Ghosh of Trinamool Congress defeated Dr. Subrata Maiti of CPI(M) in 2001. Sukumar Das of Congress defeated Surya Chakraborty of CPI(M) in 1996 and 1991. Surya Chakraborty of CPI(M) defeated Sukumar Das of Congress in 1987. Dinabandhu Mondal of CPI(M) defeated Ramani Mohan Maity of Congress in 1982. Saswati Bag of Janata Party defeated Dinabandhu Mondal of CPI(M) in 1977.

=== 1972 ===
Ahindra Mishra of Congress won in 1972. Sushil Kumar Dhara representing Bangla Congress won in 1971, 1969 and 1967, and representing Congress in 1962. In 1957 Mahisadal was a dual seat. It was won by Dr. Prafulla Chandra Ghosh of PSP and Mahtab Chand Das of Congress. In independent India's first election in 1951, the Mahisadal seat was won by the Independent candidate, Kumar Deba Prosad Garga.
