= Madhyamgram Assembly constituency =

Madhyamgram
- Constituency No. 118 for the West Bengal Legislative Assembly
- Interactive Map Outlining Madhyamgram Assembly Constituency

Constituency details
- Country: India
- Region: East India
- State: West Bengal
- District: North 24 Parganas
- Lok Sabha constituency: Barasat
- Established: 2011
- Total electors: 2,44,690 (2026)
- Reservation: None

Member of Legislative Assembly
- 18th West Bengal Legislative Assembly
- Incumbent Rathin Ghosh
- Party: Mamata All India Trinamool Congress
- Elected year: 2026

Most Successful parties from Madhyamgram assembly
1. All India Trinamool Congress (4 time) (100.0%)

Madhyamgram Assembly constituency is an assembly constituency in North 24 Parganas district in the Indian state of West Bengal.

== Overview ==
As per orders of the Delimitation Commission, No. 118 Madhyamgram Assembly constituency is composed of the following: Madhyamgram municipality, Chandigarh Rohanda, Kemia Khamarpara gram panchayats of Barasat II community development block, and Ichhapur Nilganj, Paschim Khilkapur and Purba Khilkapur gram panchayats of Barasat I community development block.

Madhyamgram Assembly constituency is part of No. 17 Barasat (Lok Sabha constituency).

== Members of the Legislative Assembly ==
Election Year	Constituency	Name of M.L.A.	Party affiliation
2011	Madhyamgram	Rathin Ghosh	All India Trinamool Congress
2016	Madhyamgram	Rathin Ghosh	All India Trinamool Congress
2021	Madhyamgram	Rathin Ghosh	All India Trinamool Congress
2026	Madhyamgram	Rathin Ghosh	All India Trinamool Congress

== Election results ==
=== 2026 ===
Rathin Ghosh, involvement in a multi-crore municipal recruitment scam. The Enforcement Directorate (ED) and Central Bureau of Investigation (CBI) are investigating the illegal recruitment of approximately 1,500 people across various civic bodies between 2014 and 2018. It is alleged that jobs were provided in exchange for bribes.

2026 West Bengal Legislative Assembly election: Madhyamgram
Party	Candidate	Votes	%	±%
AITC	Rathin Ghosh	95,995	41.21	−7.72
BJP	Anindya Banerjee	93,596	40.18	+12.14
Indian Secular Front	Priyanka Barman	35,501	15.24	−5.05
AIFB	Nitai Pal	2,209	0.95	
NOTA	None of the above	1,474	0.63	−0.74
Majority		2,399	1.03	−19.86
Turnout		232,916	95.19	+10.6
AITC hold		Swing		

=== 2021 ===
In the 2021 election, Rathin Ghosh of Trinamool Congress defeated his nearest rival, Rajasree Rajbanshi of BJP.

West Bengal assembly elections, 2021: Madhyamgram constituency
Party	Candidate	Votes	%	±%
AITC	Rathin Ghosh	112,741	48.93	
BJP	Rajasree Rajbanshi	64,615	28.04	
Indian Secular Front	Biswajit Maity	46,748	20.29	
NOTA	None of the above	3,152	1.37	
Majority		48,126	20.89	
Turnout		230,431	84.59	
AITC hold		Swing		

=== 2016 ===
In the 2016 election, Rathin Ghosh of Trinamool Congress defeated his nearest rival Tapas Majumdar of Indian National Congress, the coalition candidate.

West Bengal assembly elections, 2016: Madhyamgram constituency
Party	Candidate	Votes	%	±%
AITC	Rathin Ghosh	110,271	53.09	−4.09
INC	Tapas Majumdar	74,467	35.85	
BJP	Debasis Mitra	17,148	8.26	+5.20
NOTA	None of the above	2,932	1.41	
BSP	Himangshu Mondal	2,886	1.39	−1.04
Turnout		207,704	86.63	−2.12
AITC hold		Swing		

=== 2011 ===
In the 2011 election, Rathin Ghosh of Trinamool Congress, the United Progressive Alliance (India) candidate, defeated his nearest rival Ranjit Choudhury of Forward Bloc.

West Bengal assembly elections, 2011: Madhyamgram constituency
Party	Candidate	Votes	%	±%
AITC	Rathin Ghosh	99,841	57.18	
AIFB	Ranjit Choudhury	65,173	37.33	
BJP	Bijoy Banerjee	5,350	3.06	
BSP	Jaydeb Biswas	4,236	2.43	
Turnout		174,600	88.75	
AITC win (new seat)				
