= Nationalist Citizens Party of India =

- Abbreviation: NCPI
- President: Jyoti Prokash Chatterjee
- General Secretary: Shantanu Dey
- Parliamentary Chairperson: Kakoli Ghosh Dastidar
- Lok Sabha Leader: Sudip Bandyopadhyay
- Founder: Shewly Kundu
- Founded: 14 October 2022 (4 years ago)
- Headquarters: Sankrail, Howrah, West Bengal
- Ideology: Regionalism; Conservatism
- Political position: Centre-right
- Colours: Purple
- ECI status: Registered-Unrecognised
- Alliance: National Alliance; NDA (since 2026)
- Seats in Lok Sabha: 20 / 543

Election symbol
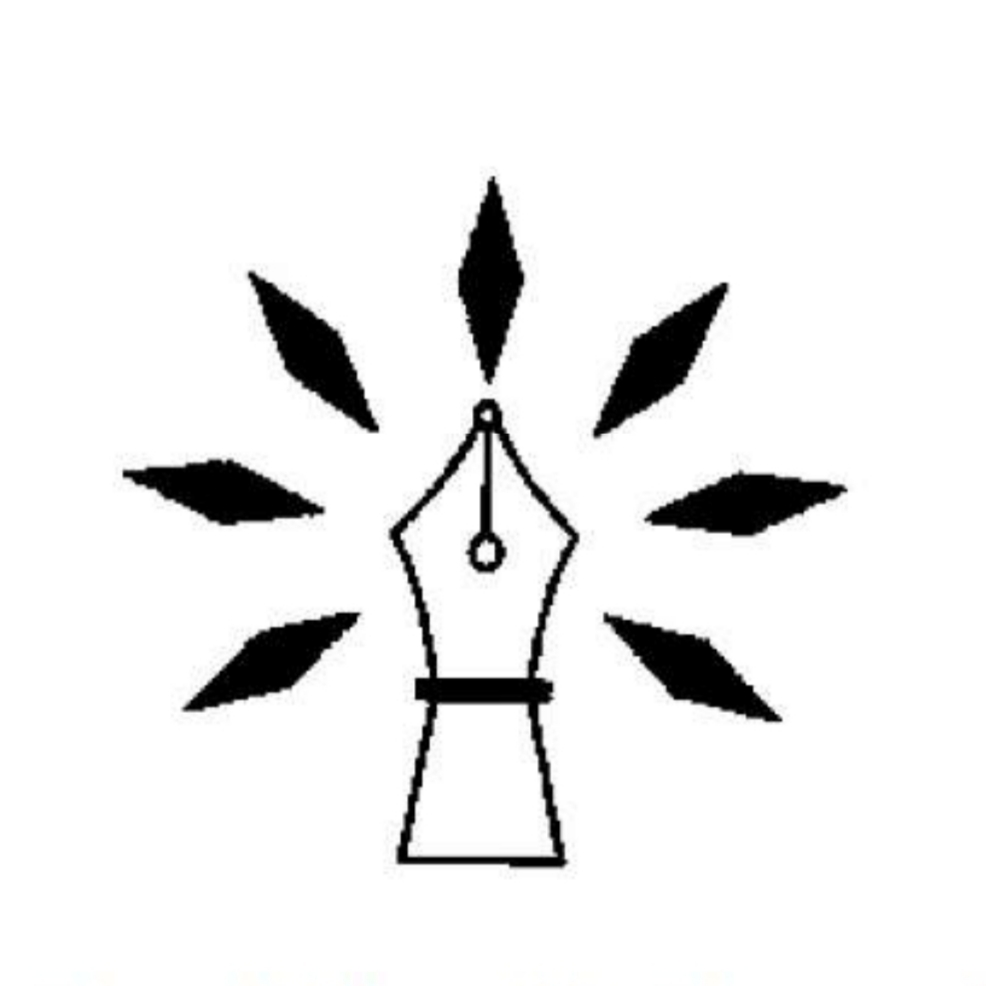

Party flag

Website
- https://www.thencpi.com/

The Nationalist Citizens Party of India (NCPI) is a political party that is active in the eastern region of India, including West Bengal, Tripura, and Assam. The NCPI is a registered unrecognised party that has participated in state assembly elections, with a focus on representing the Bengali-speaking communities. In June 2026, after the merger of 20 All India Trinamool Congress (AITC) Members of Parliament (MP)s, it has become the fifth largest political party in Lok Sabha, the lower house of India's parliament, and the second largest ally of the ruling coalition in the Lok Sabha, Bharatiya Janata Party-led National Democratic Alliance (NDA).

== Foundation and history ==
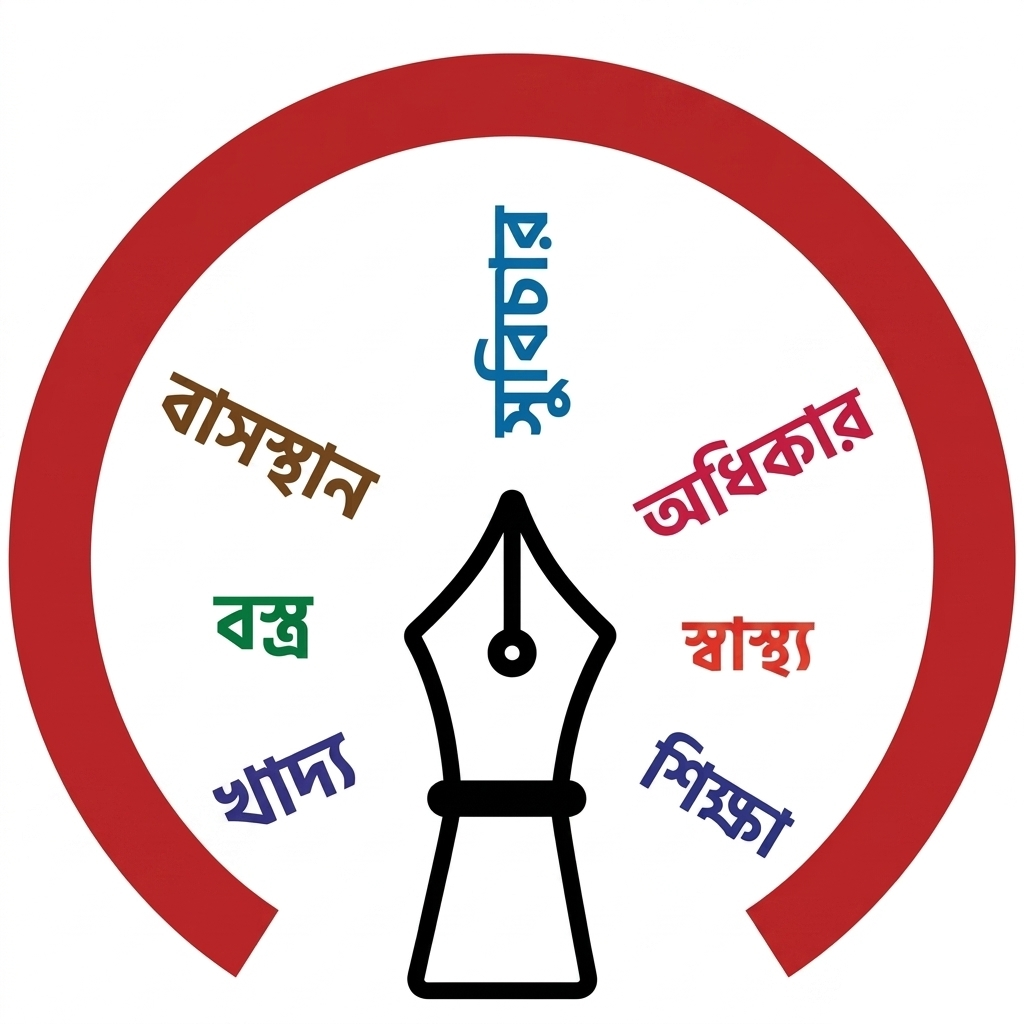
Seven principles of NCPI

The Nationalist Citizens Party of India (NCPI) was founded in 2022, while according to ECI the party was registered on 20 January 2023, with Shewly Kundu as its president and chairperson and Saikat Das as its general secretary. Their headquarters is located in Howrah, West Bengal.

The NCPI contested the 2023 Tripura Legislative Assembly election on the Pen Nib with Seven Rays symbol, fielding candidates in four constituencies — Chawamanu, Ambassa, Karamchara and Kailashahar. The party performed poorly in all four seats, with its candidates either polling fewer votes than the NOTA option or only margin.

In June 2026, 20 MPs including Kakoli Ghosh Dastidar from the AITC merged with the NCPI.

=== AITC (Rebel Bloc) merger ===
Following the defeat in the 2026 West Bengal Legislative Assembly election and growing internal unrest, more than two-thirds of the All India Trinamool Congress's parliamentary strength (20 out of 28 MPs) rebelled against the leadership of Mamata Banerjee and Abhishek Banerjee. After a rebellion in the AITC, 20 members of parliament joined the NCPI. The merger was due to the complications that the rebel group would face if they formed an independent bloc under the AITC label.

According to political analysts, the rebel MPs' decision to merge with a registered regional political party rather than form a separate bloc within AITC was intended to avoid legal complications under anti-defection law, as it states that "When two-thirds of the legislators of a political party decide to merge with another party, neither those who join the new party nor the ones who stay with the original party face disqualification."

== Leadership ==
=== Party leadership ===
List of Party Presidents
#	Name	Term in office			
#	Name	Assumed office	Left office	Time in office	Ref.
1	Shewly Kundu	14 October 2022	14 June 2026	3 years, 243 days	
2	Kakoli Ghosh Dastidar	14 June 2026	22 September 2026	100 days	
3	Jyoti Prokash Chatterjee	22 September 2026	Incumbent	59 days	

=== Legislative leadership ===
==== List of Lok Sabha MP's ====
This is a list of members of the 18th Lok Sabha arranged by the states and union territories they are elected from. These MPs were elected in the 2024 Indian general election held in April–June 2024.

West Bengal, India 18th Lok Sabha as of 2026

Keys:

- NCPI (20)

Lok Sabha Member of Parliament (India)
#	Constituency	Portrait	Name	Popular Vote	Margin
1	Cooch Behar (SC)		Jagadish Chandra Barma Basunia	7,88,375	39,250
2	Jangipur		Khalilur Rahaman	5,44,427	1,16,637
3	Baharampur		Yusuf Pathan	5,24,516	85,022
4	Murshidabad		Abu Taher Khan	6,82,442	1,64,215
5	Barrackpore		Partha Bhowmick	5,20,231	64,438
6	Barasat		Kakoli Ghosh Dastidar	6,92,010	1,14,189
7	Mathurapur (SC)		Bapi Halder	7,55,731	2,01,057
8	Jadavpur		Saayoni Ghosh	7,17,899	2,58,201
9	Kolkata Dakshin		Mala Roy	6,15,274	1,87,231
10	Kolkata Uttar		Sudip Bandyopadhyay	4,54,696	92,560
11	Howrah		Prasun Banerjee	6,26,493	1,69,442
12	Hooghly		Rachana Banerjee	7,02,744	76,853
13	Arambagh (SC)		Mitali Bag	7,12,587	6,399
14	Ghatal		Deepak Adhikari	8,37,990	1,82,868
15	Jhargram (ST)		Kalipada Soren	7,43,478	1,74,048
16	Medinipur		June Malia	7,02,192	27,191
17	Bankura		Arup Chakraborty	6,41,813	32,778
18	Bardhaman Purba (SC)		Sharmila Sarkar	7,20,302	1,60,572
19	Bolpur (SC)		Asit Kumar Mal	8,55,633	3,27,253
20	Birbhum		Satabdi Roy	7,17,961	1,97,650

== Electoral performance ==
Tripura Legislative Assembly elections
Year	Assembly	Party leader	Seats contested	Seats won	Change in seats	(%) of votes	Vote swing	Popular vote	Outcome
2023	13th	Shewly Kundu	2	0 / 60	new	0.03	new	822	Lost

== See also ==
- All India Trinamool Congress
- 2026 All India Trinamool Congress split
- 2026 West Bengal Legislative Assembly election
