= Rathin Ghosh =

Indian politician

Minister for Food & Supplies, Government Of West Bengal
- In office 10 May 2021 – 6th May, 2026
- Governor: Jagdeep Dhankhar; La. Ganesan; C. V. Ananda Bose
- Chief Minister: Mamata Banerjee
- Preceded by: Jyotipriya Mallick
- Succeeded by: Ashok Kirtania

Member of the West Bengal Legislative Assembly
- Incumbent
- Assumed office May 13, 2011
- Governor: M. K. Narayanan; Keshari Nath Tripathi; Jagdeep Dhankhar
- Preceded by: Constituency Established
- Constituency: Madhyamgram

Personal details
- Born: December 15, 1958 (age 67)
- Party: All India Trinamool Congress (until 2026); Mamata All India Trinamool Congress (from 2026)
- Spouse: Krishna Ghosh
- Children: 1
- Education: Calcutta University

Rathin Ghosh (15 December 1958) is an Indian politician belonging to the Mamata India Trinamool Congress and former Food and Supplies Minister of West Bengal in the third Mamata Banerjee Government. He was elected as a member of West Bengal Legislative Assembly from Madhyamgram in 2011, 2016, 2021 and 2026.

== Career ==
In 1998, he joined the Trinamool Congress and won the Madhyamgram Municipality election, defeating the then-ruling Left Front. He subsequently became the first Trinamool Congress Chairman in North 24 Parganas, under whose leadership the party formed its first municipal board in the district. Prior to this, Ghosh was associated with the Indian National Congress and later served as Chairman of the Madhyamgram Municipality in 1999. He was also elected as a corporator in the 2004 municipal board.

Over the course of his career, Ghosh has served three terms as Chairman of the municipality, four terms as a corporator, and three terms as a Member of the West Bengal Legislative Assembly.

Following the 2021 West Bengal Legislative Assembly elections, Chief Minister Mamata Banerjee appointed him as a Cabinet Minister in the Government of West Bengal. He served as the Minister for Food and Supplies Department of the Government of West Bengal.
