= Kakoli Ghosh Dastidar =

Indian politician (born 1959)

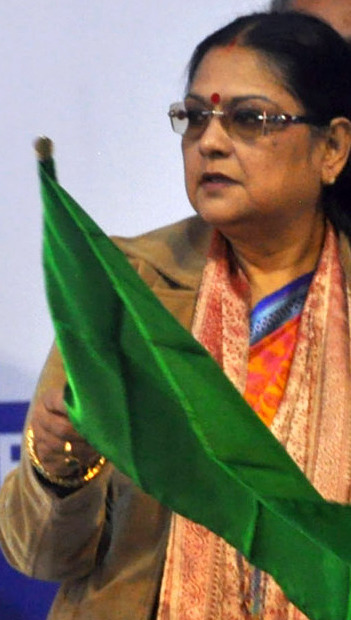
- Kakoli Ghosh Dastidar in 2016 flagging off a new train at Howrah Station, West Bengal

Member of Panel of Chairpersons (Lok Sabha)
- Incumbent
- Assumed office 1 July 2024 Serving with Dilip Saikia, Jagdambika Pal, Krishna Prasad Tenneti, Sandhya Ray, A. Raja, P. C. Mohan, Awadhesh Prasad, Selja Kumari, N. K. Premachandran
- Appointed by: Om Birla

National President of the Nationalist Citizens Party of India
- In office 14 June 2026 – 22 September 2026
- Preceded by: Shewly Kundu
- Succeeded by: Jyoti Prokash Chatterjee

Parliamentary Chairperson of the Nationalist Citizens Party of India in the Lok Sabha
- Incumbent
- Assumed office 14 June 2026
- Preceded by: Office established

Member of Parliament, Lok Sabha
- Incumbent
- Assumed office 16 May 2009
- Preceded by: Subrata Bose
- Constituency: Barasat, West Bengal

Personal details
- Born: Kakoli Moitra; 23 November 1959 (age 66) Kolkata, West Bengal, India
- Party: Nationalist Citizens Party of India (2026–present)
- Other political affiliations: Indian National Congress (till 1998); Trinamool Congress (1998–2026)
- Spouse: Sudarshan Ghosh Dastidar (m. 1982)
- Children: 2
- Education: King's College London; R. G. Kar Medical College and Hospital
- Profession: Physician
- As of 17 September, 2009

Kakoli Ghosh Dastidar (born 23 November 1959) is an Indian physician and politician from West Bengal. She is a four-time Member of Parliament (MP) in the Lok Sabha from West Bengal since 2009. She was a prominent leader of Trinamool Congress (TMC) until June 2026, when she led a group of TMC MPs to merge with the Nationalist Citizens Party of India. In the 2009 elections, she won from Barasat (Lok Sabha constituency), and was re-elected in the 2014, 2019, and 2024 Indian general elections..

Kakoli Ghosh Dastidar was the National President of All India Trinamool Mahila Congress, the women's wing of TMC. In August 2025, Ghosh Dastidar was appointed as the Chief Whip of the All India Trinamool Congress (TMC) in the Lok Sabha. In May 2026, after the AITC (TMC) party's defeat in the West Bengal state elections, Ghosh Dastidar distanced herself from party chief Mamata Banerjee, and resigned all TMC party posts, citing corruption under her rule and the mishandling of the 2024 Kolkata rape and murder.

In June 2026, Kakoli Ghosh Dastidar led a breakaway group of more than two-thirds of the All India Trinamool Congress (TMC) MPs (20 out of 28 MPs), who rebelled against the leadership of Mamata Banerjee. Subsequently, Kakoli Ghosh Dastidar and the rebel MPs decided to merge with the registered regional political party, Nationalist Citizens Party of India (NCPI) to avoid legal complications under the anti-defection law.

== Early life ==
Kakoli Ghosh was born on 23 November 1959. Her family has had a connection to West Bengal and Indian politics and government for three generations. Her maternal grandfather served as the postmaster general of West Bengal. Her paternal uncle, the late Arun Moitra, was a freedom fighter and a former Pradesh Congress President. Her maternal uncle, Gurudas Dasgupta, was also a Member of the Indian Parliament.

Ajit Moitra, who is Dastidar's father, built his family farm in Digberia of Barasat in North 24 Parganas District of West Bengal. Member of Parliament (MP) Ghosh grew up at her family's farm. Her husband, Dr. Sudarshan Ghosh Dastidar, is an infertility and IVF specialist and a former minister of West Bengal. They have two sons.

== Education ==
Kakoli Ghosh gained her medical degree from R. G. Kar Medical College and Hospital, Kolkata, which was then affiliated with the University of Calcutta. She also did a Post Graduate Training in Obstetric Ultrasound from King's College London.

== Medical Career ==
Dastidar has been involved in healthcare initiatives in West Bengal, including providing healthcare for the poor, while also helping implement a school and dispensary in South 24 Parganas for the children of trafficked women.

== Political Career ==
Ghosh Dastidar grew up in a socio-political environment with a family legacy of public service and has served the local community, including providing health services to women from poor communities.

In 2009, Dastidar became a Member of Parliament in the Lok Sabha and retained the constituency in four successive elections, becoming one of TMC's most prominent women leaders and serving as the party's chief whip in the Lok Sabha since 2024.

=== 1996 - 2025 ===
In 2009 Lok Sabha elections, she won from Barasat (Lok Sabha constituency) by a margin of 1,22,901 votes. She had earlier lost the elections from Diamond Harbour (Lok Sabha constituency), Howrah (Lok Sabha constituency) and Ballyganj assembly constituency. and Jadavpur Assembly Constituency in 1996.

She served as a member of Panel of Chairpersons since 17th Lok Sabha and as Group leader for Indian Parliamentary Friendly groups for Bulgaria appointed by 18th Lok Sabha. In 2025, she was also a member of the Committee on Home Affairs in the Lok Sabha (People's Chamber) of the Indian Parliament.

On 5 August 2025, Kakoli Ghosh Dastidar was appointed Chief Whip of the All India Trinamool Congress in the Lok Sabha, succeeding Kalyan Banerjee following his resignation from the post.

=== 2026 onwards ===
In May 2026, after the TMC party's defeat in the 2026 West Bengal Assembly elections, several senior leaders and legislators, including Kakoli Ghosh Dastidar, distanced themselves from Mamata Banerjee, the Trinamool Congress (TMC) party chief, citing widespread corruption and violence by some party workers.

On 27 May 2026, Ghosh Dastidar resigned all posts she held in the TMC and accused fellow MP Kalyan Banerjee of verbal abuse and misogyny, and also cited corruption in the previous government, the 2024 Kolkata rape and murder, and the influence of the political consultancy group Indian Political Action Committee (IPAC) over the TMC for her resigning from her party positions.

In June 2026, Kakoli Ghosh Dastidar led a breakaway group of more than two-thirds of the TMC MPs (20 out of 28 MPs), who rebelled against the leadership of Mamata Banerjee and Abhishek Banerjee, and sought recognition as a separate bloc in Parliament. After a rebellion in the All India Trinamool Congress, 20 members of parliament joined the NCPI.

Subsequently, Kakoli Ghosh Dastidar and the rebel MPs decided to merge with the registered regional political party NCPI to avoid legal complications under the anti-defection law.

== Electoral History ==
=== Lok Sabha ===
Year	Constituency	Party	Votes	%	Opponent	Party	Votes	%	Result	Margin	%
2024	Barasat	AITC	6,92,010	45.69	Swapan Majumder	BJP	5,77,821	38.15	Won	+1,14,189	+7.54
2019	Barasat	AITC	6,48,444	46.44	Mrinal Kanti Debnath	BJP	5,38,275	38.55	Won	+1,10,169	+7.89
2014	Barasat	AITC	5,25,387	41.36	Dr. Mortoza Hossain	AIFB	3,52,246	27.73	Won	+1,73,141	+13.63
2009	Barasat	AITC	5,22,530	50.95	Sudin Chattopadhyay	AIFB	3,99,629	38.97	Won	+1,22,901	+11.98
1999	Howrah	AITC	3,87,088	39.44	Swadesh Chakraborty	CPI(M)	4,90,537	49.98	Lost	-1,03,449	-10.54
1998	Diamond Harbour	AITC	3,44,092	39.05	Samik Lahiri	CPI(M)	4,05,048	45.97	Lost	-60,956	-6.92
