= Opinion polling for the 2024 Indian general election =

Surveys and polls for 2024 Indian general election

In the run-up to the 2024 Indian general election, various media houses and polling agencies carried out opinion polls to gauge voting intentions. Results of such polls are displayed in this list.

Seats by constituency. As this is a FPTP election, seat totals are not determined proportional to each party's total vote share, but instead by the plurality in each constituency

== Seats and vote share projections ==
Vote share projections

Vote share projections
Polling agency	Date published	Sample size	Margin of error				Lead
Polling agency	Date published	Sample size	Margin of error	NDA	INDIA	Others	Lead
2024 election results				43.8%	41.48%	14.72%	2.32
ABP News-CVoter	April 2024	57,566	±3–5%	46.6	39.8	13.6	6.8
News 18	March 2024	118,616	±4%	48	32	20	16
ABP News-CVoter	March 2024	41,762	±5%	46	39	15	7
Times Now-ETG	March 2024	323,357	±3%	52	42	6	10
Zee News-Matrize	February 2024	167,843	±2%	43.6	27.7	24.9	15.9
India Today-CVoter	February 2024	149,092	±3–5%	45	38	17	8
Times Now-ETG	February 2024	156,843	±2%	41.8	28.6	29.6	13.2
ABP News-CVoter	December 2023	200,000	±3–5%	42	38	20	4
Times Now-ETG	December 2023	147,231	±3%	44	39	17	5
India TV-CNX	October 2023	54,250	±3%	43.4	39.1	17.5	4.3
Times Now-ETG	October 2023	135,100	±3%	42.6	40.2	17.2	2.4
Times Now-ETG	August 2023	110,662	±3%	42.6	40.2	17.2	2.4
India Today-CVoter	August 2023	160,438	±3–5%	43	41	16	2
Formation of the big-tent INDIA opposition bloc
India Today-CVoter	January 2023	140,917	±3–5%	43	30	27	13
2019 election results				45.3%	27.5%	27.2%	17.8

Seat projections
Polling agency	Date published	Sample size	Margin of error				Lead
Polling agency	Date published	Sample size	Margin of error	NDA	INDIA	Others	Lead
2024 election results				293	234	16	NDA +43
TV9 Bharatvarsh - People's Insight - Polstrat	April 2024	2,500,000	3%	362	149	32	NDA +81
ABP News-CVoter	April 2024	57,566	±3–5%	373	155	15	NDA +203
Times Now-ETG	April 2024	271,292	±3%	384	118	41	NDA +224
News18	March 2024	118,616	±4%	411	105	27	NDA +279
ABP News-CVoter	March 2024	41,762	±5%	366	156	21	NDA +189
India TV-CNX	March 2024	162,900	±3%	378	98	67	NDA +213
Times Now-ETG	March 2024	323,357	±3%	358–398	110–130	40–50	NDA
Zee News-Matrize	February 2024	167,843	±2%	377	93	73	NDA +211
India Today-CVoter	February 2024	149,092	±3–5%	335	166	42	NDA +127
Times Now-ETG	February 2024	156,843	±2%	366	104	73	NDA +189
ABP-CVoter	December 2023	200,000	±3–5%	295–335	165–205	35–65	NDA +80
Times Now-ETG	December 2023	147,231	±3%	319–339	148–168	52–61	NDA +114
India TV-CNX	October 2023	54,250	±3%	315	172	56	NDA +87
Times Now-ETG	October 2023	135,100	±3%	297–317	165–185	57–65	NDA
Times Now-ETG	August 2023	110,662	±3%	296–326	160–190	56–64	NDA
India Today-CVoter	August 2023	160,438	±3–5%	306	193	54	NDA
Formation of the big-tent INDIA opposition bloc
India Today-CVoter	January 2023	140,917	±3–5%	298	153	92	NDA
2019 election results				353	91	99	NDA

== Data of states and union territories ==
=== Andaman and Nicobar Islands (1) ===
Polling agency	Date published	Margin of error				Lead
Polling agency	Date published	Margin of error	NDA	INDIA	Others	Lead
India TV-CNX	April 2024	±3%	1	0	0	NDA
ABP News-CVoter	March 2024	±5%	1	0	0	NDA

=== Andhra Pradesh (25) ===
Polling agency	Date published	Margin of error						Lead
Polling agency	Date published	Margin of error	YSRCP	NDA		INDIA	Others	Lead
Polling agency	Date published	Margin of error	YSRCP	TDP+	BJP	INDIA	Others	Lead
ABP News-CVoter	April 2024	±5%	5	20		0	0	NDA
News 18	March 2024	±3%	7	18		0	0	NDA
ABP News-CVoter	March 2024	±5%	5	20		0	0	NDA
TDP+ joins NDA
India Today-CVoter	February 2024	±3–5%	8	17	0	0	0	TDP
Times Now-ETG	December 2023	±3%	24–25	0–1	0	0	0	YSRCP
India TV-CNX	October 2023	±3%	15	10	0	0	0	YSRCP
Times Now-ETG	September 2023	±3%	24–25	0–1	0	0	0	YSRCP
Times Now-ETG	August 2023	±3%	24–25	0–1	0	0	0	YSRCP

Polling agency	Date published	Margin of error						Lead
Polling agency	Date published	Margin of error	YSRCP	NDA		INDIA	Others	Lead
Polling agency	Date published	Margin of error	YSRCP	TDP+	BJP	INDIA	Others	Lead
ABP News-CVoter	April 2024	±5%	39.9%	46.7%		13.4%		6.8
News 18	March 2024	±3%	41%	50%		6%	3%	9
ABP News-CVoter	March 2024	±5%	42%	45%		3%	10%	3
TDP+ joins NDA
India Today-CVoter	February 2024	±3–5%	41%	45%	2%	3%	9%	4
Times Now-ETG	December 2023	±3%	50%	47%	1%	1%	1%	3
India TV-CNX	October 2023	±3–5%	46%	42%	2%	2%	8%	4
Times Now-ETG	September 2023	±3%	51.1%	36.4%	1.3%	1.1%	10.1%	14.7

=== Arunachal Pradesh (2) ===
Polling agency	Date published	Margin of error				Lead
Polling agency	Date published	Margin of error	NDA	INDIA	Others	Lead
ABP News-CVoter	April 2024	±5%	2	0	0	NDA
ABP News-CVoter	March 2024	±5%	2	0	0	NDA
Times Now-ETG	December 2023	±3%	2	0	0	NDA
India TV-CNX	October 2023	±3%	2	0	0	NDA
Times Now-ETG	September 2023	±3%	2	0	0	NDA
Times Now-ETG	August 2023	±3%	2	0	0	NDA

Polling agency	Date published	Margin of error				Lead
Polling agency	Date published	Margin of error	NDA	INDIA	Others	Lead
ABP News-CVoter	April 2024	±5%	63%	32%	5%	31
ABP News-CVoter	March 2024	±5%	61%	32%	7%	29

=== Assam (14) ===
Polling agency	Date published	Margin of error					Lead
Polling agency	Date published	Margin of error	NDA	INDIA	AIUDF	Others	Lead
ABP News-CVoter	April 2024	±5%	12	2	0		NDA
ABP News-CVoter	March 2024	±5%	12	2	0		NDA
India TV-CNX	March 2024	±3%	12	1	1		NDA
India Today-CVoter	February 2024	±3-5%	12	2	0		NDA
Times Now-ETG	December 2023	±3%	9-11	2-4	0-1		NDA
India TV-CNX	October 2023	±3%	12	1	1		NDA
Times Now-ETG	September 2023	±3%	7-9	4-6	0-1		NDA
Times Now-ETG	August 2023	±3%	9-11	3-4	0-1		NDA
India Today-CVoter	August 2023	±3-5%	12	1	1		NDA

Polling agency	Date published	Margin of error					Lead
Polling agency	Date published	Margin of error	NDA	INDIA	AIUDF	Others	Lead
ABP News-CVoter	April 2024	±5%	51.8%	35.5%	16.3%		12.7
ABP News-CVoter	March 2024	±5%	45%	38%	13%		7
India Today-CVoter	February 2024	±3-5%	46%	31%	23%		15
India Today-CVoter	August 2023	±3-5%	48%	36%	16%		12

=== Bihar (40) ===
Polling agency	Date published	Margin of error				Lead
Polling agency	Date published	Margin of error	NDA	INDIA	Others	Lead
ABP News-CVoter	April 2024	±3-5%	33	7	0	NDA
ABP News-CVoter	March 2024	±5%	32	8	0	NDA
India Today-CVoter	February 2024	±3-5%	32	8	0	NDA
JD(U) leaves INDIA and joins NDA
ABP News-CVoter	December 2023	±3-5%	16-18	21-23	0-2	INDIA
Times Now-ETG	December 2023	±3%	22-24	15-17	0	NDA
India TV-CNX	October 2023	±3%	24	16	0	NDA
Times Now-ETG	September 2023	±3%	18-20	20-22	0	INDIA
Times Now-ETG	August 2023	±3%	22-24	16-18	0	NDA
India Today-CVoter	August 2023	±3-5%	14	26	0	INDIA

Polling agency	Date published	Margin of error				Lead
Polling agency	Date published	Margin of error	NDA	INDIA	Others	Lead
ABP News-CVoter	April 2024	±3-5%	50.8%	39.9%	9.3%	10.9
ABP News-CVoter	March 2024	±5%	50%	35%	15%	15
India Today-CVoter	February 2024	±3-5%	52%	38%	10%	14
JD(U) leaves INDIA and joins NDA
India Today-CVoter	August 2023	±3-5%	43%	47%	10%	4

=== Chandigarh (1) ===
Polling agency	Date published	Margin of error				Lead
Polling agency	Date published	Margin of error	NDA	INDIA	Others	Lead
ABP News-CVoter	April 2024	±5%	1	0	0	NDA
ABP News-CVoter	March 2024	±5%	1	0	0	NDA
Times Now-ETG	December 2023	±3%	1	0	0	NDA
India TV-CNX	October 2023	±3%	1	0	0	NDA
Times Now-ETG	September 2023	±3%	1	0	0	NDA
Times Now-ETG	August 2023	±3%	1	0	0	NDA

Polling agency	Date published	Margin of error				Lead
Polling agency	Date published	Margin of error	NDA	INDIA	Others	Lead
ABP News-CVoter	March 2024	±5%	51%	44%	5%	6

=== Chhattisgarh (11) ===
Polling agency	Date published	Margin of error				Lead
Polling agency	Date published	Margin of error	NDA	INDIA	Others	Lead
ABP News-CVoter	April 2024	±3-5%	11	0	0	NDA
ABP News-CVoter	March 2024	±5%	11	0	0	NDA
India Today-CVoter	February 2024	±3-5%	10	1	0	NDA
ABP News-CVoter	December 2023	±3-5%	9-11	0-2	0	NDA
Times Now-ETG	December 2023	±3%	10-11	0-1	0	NDA
India TV-CNX	October 2023	±3%	7	4	0	NDA
Times Now-ETG	September 2023	±3%	7-9	2-4	0	NDA
Times Now-ETG	August 2023	±3%	6-8	3-5	0	NDA
India Today-CVoter	August 2023	±3-5%	10	1	0	NDA

Polling agency	Date published	Margin of error				Lead
Polling agency	Date published	Margin of error	NDA	INDIA	Others	Lead
ABP News-CVoter	April 2024	±3-5%	54.8%	40.8%	4.4%	14
ABP News-CVoter	March 2024	±5%	55%	41%	4%	14
India Today-CVoter	February 2024	±3-5%	54%	38%	8%	16
India Today-CVoter	August 2023	±3-5%	51%	41%	8%	10

=== Dadra and Nagar Haveli and Daman and Diu (2) ===
Polling agency	Date published	Margin of error				Lead
Polling agency	Date published	Margin of error	NDA	INDIA	Others	Lead
ABP News-CVoter	March 2024	±5%	2	0	0	NDA
Times Now-ETG	December 2023	±3%	2	0	0	NDA
India TV-CNX	October 2023	±3%	2	0	0	NDA
Times Now-ETG	September 2023	±3%	1-2	0-1	0	NDA
Times Now-ETG	August 2023	±3%	1-2	0-1	0	NDA

Polling agency	Date published	Margin of error				Lead
Polling agency	Date published	Margin of error	NDA	INDIA	Others	Lead
ABP News-CVoter	March 2024	±5%	52%	19%	29%	23

=== Delhi (7) ===
Polling agency	Date published	Margin of error				Lead
Polling agency	Date published	Margin of error	NDA	INDIA	Others	Lead
ABP News-CVoter	March 2024	±5%	7	0	0	NDA
India Today-CVoter	February 2024	±3-5%	7	0	0	NDA
Times Now-ETG	December 2023	±3%	6-7	0-1	0	NDA
India TV-CNX	October 2023	±3%	7	0	0	NDA
Times Now-ETG	September 2023	±3%	5-6	1-2	0	NDA
Times Now-ETG	August 2023	±3%	5-6	1-2	0	NDA
India Today-CVoter	August 2023	±3-5%	7	0	0	NDA

Polling agency	Date published	Margin of error				Lead
Polling agency	Date published	Margin of error	NDA	INDIA	Others	Lead
ABP News-CVoter	March 2024	±5%	57%	36%	7%	21
India Today-CVoter	February 2024	±3-5%	57%	40%	3%	17
India Today-CVoter	August 2023	±3-5%	54%	42%	4%	12

=== Goa (2) ===
Polling agency	Date published	Margin of error				Lead
Polling agency	Date published	Margin of error	NDA	INDIA	Others	Lead
ABP News-CVoter	April 2024	±5%	1	1	0	Tie
ABP News-CVoter	March 2024	±5%	1	1	0	Tie
India TV-CNX	March 2024	±3%	2	0	0	NDA
India Today-CVoter	February 2024	±3-5%	1	1	0	Tie
Times Now-ETG	December 2023	±3%	1-2	0-1	0	NDA
India TV-CNX	October 2023	±3%	2	0	0	NDA
Times Now-ETG	September 2023	±3%	1-2	0-1	0	NDA
Times Now-ETG	August 2023	±3%	1-2	0-1	0	NDA

Polling agency	Date published	Margin of error				Lead
Polling agency	Date published	Margin of error	NDA	INDIA	Others	Lead
ABP News-CVoter	April 2024	±5%	46%	44.9%	9.1%	1.1
ABP News-CVoter	March 2024	±5%	45.6%	48.3%	6.1%	2.7
India Today-CVoter	February 2024	±3-5%	37%	55%	8%	18

=== Gujarat (26) ===
Polling agency	Date published	Margin of error				Lead
Polling agency	Date published	Margin of error	NDA	INDIA	Others	Lead
ABP News-CVoter	April 2024	±3-5%	26	0	0	NDA
ABP News-CVoter	March 2024	±3-5%	26	0	0	NDA
India TV-CNX	March 2024	±3%	26	0	0	NDA
India Today-CVoter	February 2024	±3-5%	26	0	0	NDA
ABP News-CVoter	December 2023	±3-5%	26	0	0	NDA
Times Now-ETG	December 2023	±3%	26	0	0	NDA
India TV-CNX	October 2023	±3%	26	0	0	NDA
Times Now-ETG	September 2023	±3%	26	0	0	NDA
Times Now-ETG	August 2023	±3%	26	0	0	NDA

Polling agency	Date published	Margin of error				Lead
Polling agency	Date published	Margin of error	NDA	INDIA	Others	Lead
ABP News-CVoter	April 2024	±3-5%	63%	33.7%	3.3%	29.3
ABP News-CVoter	March 2024	±3-5%	64%	35%	1%	29
India Today-CVoter	February 2024	±3-5%	62%	26%	12%	36

=== Haryana (10) ===
Polling agency	Date published	Margin of error				Lead
Polling agency	Date published	Margin of error	NDA	INDIA	Others	Lead
ABP News-CVoter	April 2024	±5%	9	1	0	NDA
ABP News-CVoter	March 2024	±5%	8	2	0	NDA
JJP leaves the NDA
India Today-CVoter	February 2024	±3-5%	8	2	0	NDA
Times Now-ETG	December 2023	±3%	8-10	0-2	0	NDA
India TV-CNX	October 2023	±3%	8	2	0	NDA
Times Now-ETG	September 2023	±3%	7-9	1-3	0	NDA
Times Now-ETG	August 2023	±3%	6-8	2-4	0	NDA

Polling agency	Date published	Margin of error				Lead
Polling agency	Date published	Margin of error	NDA	INDIA	Others	Lead
ABP News-CVoter	April 2024	±5%	53%	38%	9%	15
ABP News-CVoter	March 2024	±5%	52%	38%	10%	14
JJP leaves NDA
India Today-CVoter	February 2024	±3-5%	50%	38%	12%	12

=== Himachal Pradesh (4) ===
Polling agency	Date published	Margin of error				Lead
Polling agency	Date published	Margin of error	NDA	INDIA	Others	Lead
ABP News-CVoter	April 2024	±5%	4	0	0	NDA
ABP News-CVoter	March 2024	±5%	4	0	0	NDA
India Today-CVoter	February 2024	±3-5%	4	0	0	NDA
Times Now-ETG	December 2023	±3%	3-4	0-1	0	NDA
India TV-CNX	October 2023	±3%	3	1	0	NDA
Times Now-ETG	September 2023	±3%	3-4	0-1	0	NDA
Times Now-ETG	August 2023	±3%	3-4	0-1	0	NDA

Polling agency	Date published	Margin of error				Lead
Polling agency	Date published	Margin of error	NDA	INDIA	Others	Lead
ABP News-CVoter	April 2024	±5%	63%	33.2%	3.8%	29.8
ABP News-CVoter	March 2024	±5%	65%	32%	3%	33
India Today-CVoter	February 2024	±3-5%	60%	29%	11%	31

=== Jammu and Kashmir (5) ===
Polling agency	Date published	Margin of error				Lead
Polling agency	Date published	Margin of error	INDIA	NDA	Others	Lead
ABP News-CVoter	April 2024	±3-5%	3	2	0	INDIA
Times Now-ETG	December 2023	±3%	2-3	1-3	0-1	INDIA
ABP News-CVoter	March 2024	±5%	3	2	0	INDIA
India Today-CVoter	February 2024	±3-5%	3	2	0	INDIA
Times Now-ETG	December 2023	±3%	2-3	1-3	0-1	INDIA
India TV-CNX	October 2023	±3%	2	2	1	Tie between INDIA and NDA
Times Now-ETG	September 2023	±3%	3-4	1-2	0-1	INDIA
Times Now-ETG	August 2023	±3%	2-3	1-3	0-1	INDIA

Polling agency	Date published	Margin of error				Lead
Polling agency	Date published	Margin of error	NDA	INDIA	Others	Lead
ABP News-CVoter	April 2024	±3-5%	47%	44.9%	8.1%	3.1
ABP News-CVoter	March 2024	±5%	41.4%	51.5%	7.1%	10.1
India Today-CVoter	February 2024	±3-5%	49%	36%	15%	13

=== Jharkhand (14) ===
Polling agency	Date published	Margin of error				Lead
Polling agency	Date published	Margin of error	NDA	INDIA	Others	Lead
ABP News-CVoter	March 2024	±5%	12	2	0	NDA
India TV-CNX	March 2024	±3%	13	1	0	NDA
India Today-CVoter	February 2024	±3-5%	12	2	0	NDA
Times Now-ETG	December 2023	±3%	11-13	1-3	0	NDA
India TV-CNX	October 2023	±3%	13	1	0	NDA
Times Now-ETG	September 2023	±3%	9-11	3-5	0	NDA
Times Now-ETG	August 2023	±3%	10-12	2-4	0	NDA

Polling agency	Date published	Margin of error				Lead
Polling agency	Date published	Margin of error	NDA	INDIA	Others	Lead
ABP News-CVoter	March 2024	±5%	52%	35%	13%	17
India Today-CVoter	February 2024	±3-5%	56%	30%	14%	26

=== Karnataka (28) ===
Polling agency	Date published	Margin of error				Lead
Polling agency	Date published	Margin of error	NDA	INDIA	Others	Lead
ABP News-CVoter	April 2024	±3-5%	23	5	0	NDA
ABP News-CVoter	March 2024	±5%	23	5	0	NDA
India Today-CVoter	February 2024	±3-5%	24	4	0	NDA
ABP News-CVoter	December 2023	±3-5%	22-24	4-6	0	NDA
Times Now-ETG	December 2023	±3%	20-22	6-8	0-1	NDA
India TV-CNX	October 2023	±3%	18	10	0	NDA
Times Now-ETG	September 2023	±3%	18-21	7-9	0	NDA
Times Now-ETG	August 2023	±3%	18-20	8-10	0-1	NDA
India Today-CVoter	August 2023	±3-5%	23	5	0	NDA

Polling agency	Date published	Margin of error				Lead
Polling agency	Date published	Margin of error	NDA	INDIA	Others	Lead
ABP News-CVoter	April 2024	±3-5%	52%	42%	6%	10
Eedina	March 2024	±2%	42.4%	43.8%	13.8%	1.4
ABP News-CVoter	March 2024	±5%	53%	42%	5%	11
India Today-CVoter	February 2024	±3-5%	53%	42%	5%	11
India Today-CVoter	August 2023	±3-5%	44%	34%	22%	10

=== Kerala (20) ===
Polling agency	Date published (Note: Some polls did not differentiate between UDF and LDF, even though they are contesting separately.)	Margin of error					Lead
Polling agency	Date published	Margin of error	INDIA		NDA	Others	Lead
Polling agency	Date published	Margin of error	UDF	LDF	NDA	Others	Lead
ABP News-CVoter	April 2024	±3-5%	20	0	0	0	INDIA
Mathrubhumi News-P-MARQ	March 2024	±3%	17	3	0	0	INDIA
News 18	March 2024	±3%	17	2	1	0	INDIA
ABP News-CVoter	March 2024	±5%	19	1	0	0	INDIA
India TV-CNX	March 2024	±3%	16	3	1	0	INDIA
India Today-CVoter	February 2024	±3-5%	20		0	0	INDIA
Times Now-ETG	December 2023	±3%	15-17	3-5	0-1	0	INDIA
India TV-CNX	October 2023	±3%	18	2	0	0	INDIA
Times Now-ETG	September 2023	±3%	18-20		0-2	0	INDIA
Times Now-ETG	August 2023	±3%	18-20		0-2	0	INDIA

Polling agency	Date published (Note: Some polls did not differentiate between UDF and LDF, even though they are contesting separately.)	Margin of error					Lead
Polling agency	Date published	Margin of error	INDIA		NDA	Others	Lead
Polling agency	Date published	Margin of error	UDF	LDF	NDA	Others	Lead
ABP News-CVoter	April 2024	±3-5%	43%	31%	21%	5%	12
ABP News-CVoter	March 2024	±5%	44.5%	31.4%	19.8%	4.3%	13.1
India Today-CVoter	February 2024	±3-5%	78%		17%	5%	61
India Today-CVoter	August 2023	±3-5%	81%		14%	5%	67

=== Ladakh (1) ===
Polling agency	Date published	Margin of error				Lead
Polling agency	Date published	Margin of error	NDA	INDIA	Others	Lead
ABP News-CVoter	March 2024	±5%	1	0	0	NDA

Polling agency	Date published	Margin of error				Lead
Polling agency	Date published	Margin of error	NDA	INDIA	Others	Lead
ABP News-CVoter	March 2024	±5%	44%	41%	15%	3

=== Lakshadweep (1) ===
Polling agency	Date published	Margin of error				Lead
Polling agency	Date published	Margin of error	NDA	INDIA	Others	Lead
ABP News-CVoter	March 2024	±5%	0	1	0	INDIA
India Today-CVoter	December 2023	±3-5%	0	1	0	INDIA
Times Now-ETG	December 2023	±3%	0	1	0	INDIA
India TV-CNX	October 2023	±3%	0	1	0	INDIA
Times Now-ETG	September 2023	±3%	0	1	0	INDIA
Times Now-ETG	August 2023	±3%	0	1	0	INDIA

Polling agency	Date published	Margin of error				Lead
Polling agency	Date published	Margin of error	NDA	INDIA	Others	Lead
ABP News-CVoter	March 2024	±5%	4%	95%	1%	91

=== Madhya Pradesh (29) ===
Polling agency	Date published	Margin of error				Lead
Polling agency	Date published	Margin of error	NDA	INDIA	Others	Lead
ABP News-CVoter	April 2024	±3-5%	28	1	0	NDA
ABP News-CVoter	March 2024	±5%	28	1	0	NDA
India Today-CVoter	February 2024	±3-5%	27	2	0	NDA
ABP News-CVoter	December 2023	±3-5%	27-29	0-2	0	NDA
Times Now-ETG	December 2023	±3%	27-29	0-1	0	NDA
India TV-CNX	October 2023	±3%	25	4	0	NDA
Times Now-ETG	September 2023	±3%	25-27	2-4	0	NDA
Times Now-ETG	August 2023	±3%	24-26	3-5	0	NDA

Polling agency	Date published	Margin of error				Lead
Polling agency	Date published	Margin of error	NDA	INDIA	Others	Lead
ABP News-CVoter	April 2024	±3-5%	53%	43.3%	3.7%	9.7
ABP News-CVoter	March 2024	±5%	57.9%	40.8%	1.3%	17.1
India Today-CVoter	February 2024	±3-5%	58%	38%	4%	20
India Today-CVoter	August 2023	±3-5%	48%	41%	11%	7

=== Maharashtra (48) ===
Polling agency	Date published	Margin of error				Lead
Polling agency	Date published	Margin of error	INDIA	NDA	Others	Lead
ABP News-CVoter	April 2024	±3-5%	18	30	0	NDA
ABP News-CVoter	March 2024	±5%	20	28	0	NDA
India TV-CNX	March 2024	±3%	13	35	0	NDA
India Today-CVoter	February 2024	±3-5%	26	22	0	INDIA
ABP News-CVoter	December 2023	±3-5%	26-28	19-21	0-2	INDIA
Times Now-ETG	December 2023	±3%	16-20	27-31	1-2	NDA
India TV-CNX	October 2023	±3%	20	28	0	NDA
Times Now-ETG	September 2023	±3%	16-20	26-30	1-2	NDA
Times Now-ETG	August 2023	±3%	15-19	28-32	1-2	NDA
India Today-CVoter	August 2023	±3-5%	28	20	0	INDIA

Polling agency	Date published	Margin of error				Lead
Polling agency	Date published	Margin of error	INDIA	NDA	Others	Lead
ABP News-CVoter	April 2024	±3-5%	30	18	0	NDA
ABP News-CVoter	March 2024	±5%	42.1%	42.7%	15.2%	0.6
India Today-CVoter	February 2024	±3-5%	45%	40%	15%	5
India Today-CVoter	August 2023	±3-5%	45%	40%	15%	5

=== Manipur (2) ===
Polling agency	Date published	Margin of error				Lead
Polling agency	Date published	Margin of error	NDA	INDIA	Others	Lead
ABP News-CVoter	March 2024	±5%	2	0	0	NDA
Times Now-ETG	December 2023	±3%	1-2	0-1	0	NDA
India TV-CNX	October 2023	±3%	1	1	0	Tie
Times Now-ETG	September 2023	±3%	1-2	0-1	0	NDA
Times Now-ETG	August 2023	±3%	1-2	0-1	0	NDA

Polling agency	Date published	Margin of error				Lead
Polling agency	Date published	Margin of error	NDA	INDIA	Others	Lead
ABP News-CVoter	March 2024	±5%	50%	34%	16%	16

=== Meghalaya (2) ===
Polling agency	Date published	Margin of error				Lead
Polling agency	Date published	Margin of error	NDA	INDIA	Others	Lead
India Today-CVoter	February 2024	±3-5%	1	1	0	Tie
Times Now-ETG	December 2023	±3%	1-2	0-1	0	NDA
India TV-CNX	October 2023	±3%	2	0	0	NDA
Times Now-ETG	September 2023	±3%	1-2	0-1	0	NDA
Times Now-ETG	August 2023	±3%	1-2	0-1	0	NDA

=== Mizoram (1) ===
Polling agency	Date published	Margin of error					Lead
Polling agency	Date published	Margin of error	ZPM	NDA	INDIA	Others	Lead
ABP News-CVoter	March 2024	±5%	1	0	0	0	ZPM
India Today-CVoter	February 2024	±3-5%	1	0	0	0	ZPM
Times Now-ETG	December 2023	±3%	0	1	0	0	NDA
India TV-CNX	October 2023	±3%	0	1	0	0	NDA
Times Now-ETG	September 2023	±3%	0	1	0	0	NDA
Times Now-ETG	August 2023	±3%	0	1	0	0	NDA

=== Nagaland (1) ===
Polling agency	Date published	Margin of error				Lead
Polling agency	Date published	Margin of error	NDA	INDIA	Others	Lead
ABP News-CVoter	March 2024	±5%	1	0	0	NDA
Times Now-ETG	December 2023	±3%	1	0	0	NDA
India TV-CNX	October 2023	±3%	1	0	0	NDA
Times Now-ETG	September 2023	±3%	1	0	0	NDA
Times Now-ETG	August 2023	±3%	1	0	0	NDA

=== Odisha (21) ===
Polling agency	Date published	Margin of error				Lead
Polling agency	Date published	Margin of error	BJD	NDA	INDIA	Lead
ABP News-CVoter	March 2024	±5%	11	10	0	BJD
India TV-CNX	March 2024	±3%	11	10	0	BJD
India Today-CVoter	February 2024	±3-5%	11	10	0	BJD
Times Now-ETG	December 2023	±3%	13-15	5-7	0-1	BJD
India TV-CNX	October 2023	±3%	13	8	0	BJD
Times Now-ETG	September 2023	±3%	13-15	5-7	0-1	BJD
Times Now-ETG	August 2023	±3%	12-14	6-8	0-1	BJD

Polling agency	Date published	Margin of error					Lead
Polling agency	Date published	Margin of error	BJD	NDA	INDIA	Others	Lead
ABP News-CVoter	March 2024	±5%	40.9%	40.2%	13.8%	5.1%	0.7
India Today-CVoter	February 2024	±3-5%	41%	40%	12%	7%	1

=== Puducherry (1) ===
Polling agency	Date published	Margin of error				Lead
Polling agency	Date published	Margin of error	NDA	INDIA	Others	Lead
ABP News-CVoter	March 2024	±5%	0	1	0	INDIA

=== Punjab (13) ===
Polling agency	Date published	Margin of error					Lead
Polling agency	Date published	Margin of error	INDIA	NDA	SAD	Others	Lead
ABP News-CVoter	March 2024	±5%	11	1	1	0	INDIA
India Today-CVoter	February 2024	±3-5%	10	2	1	0	INDIA
ABP-CVoter	December 2023	±3-5%	9-11	0-2	0-2	0	INDIA
Times Now-ETG	December 2023	±3%	6-10	3-5	1-2	0-1	INDIA
India TV-CNX	October 2023	±3%	11	1	1	0	INDIA
Times Now-ETG	September 2023	±3%	8-11	1-3	1-2	0	INDIA
Times Now-ETG	August 2023	±3%	8-12	1-2	1-2	0-1	INDIA

Polling agency	Date published	Margin of error					Lead
Polling agency	Date published	Margin of error	INDIA	NDA	SAD	Others	Lead
ABP News-CVoter	March 2024	±5%	57%	16%	17%	10%	40
India Today-CVoter	February 2024	±3-5%	65%	17%	18%		47

=== Rajasthan (25) ===
Polling agency	Date published	Margin of error				Lead
Polling agency	Date published	Margin of error	NDA	INDIA	Others	Lead
ABP News-CVoter	March 2024	±5%	25	0	0	NDA
India Today-CVoter	February 2024	±3-5%	25	0	0	NDA
ABP News-CVoter	December 2023	±3-5%	23-25	0-2	0	NDA
Times Now-ETG	December 2023	±3%	24-25	0-1	0	NDA
India TV-CNX	October 2023	±3%	23	2	0	NDA
Times Now-ETG	September 2023	±3%	21-24	1-2	0-1	NDA
Times Now-ETG	August 2023	±3%	19-22	2-4	0-1	NDA

Polling agency	Date published	Margin of error				Lead
Polling agency	Date published	Margin of error	NDA	INDIA	Others	Lead
ABP News-CVoter	March 2024	±5%	60%	39%	1%	21
India Today-CVoter	February 2024	±3-5%	59%	35%	6%	24

=== Sikkim (1) ===
Polling agency	Date published	Margin of error				Lead
Polling agency	Date published	Margin of error	SDF	NDA	INDIA	Lead
ABP News-CVoter	March 2024	±5%	0	1	0	NDA
Times Now-ETG	December 2023	±3%	0	1	0	NDA
India TV-CNX	October 2023	±3%	0	1	0	NDA
Times Now-ETG	September 2023	±3%	0	1	0	NDA
Times Now-ETG	August 2023	±3%	0	1	0	NDA

=== Tamil Nadu (39) ===
Polling agency	Date published	Margin of error					Lead
Polling agency	Date published	Margin of error	INDIA	NDA	AIADMK	Others	Lead
ABP News-CVoter	April 2024	±3-5%	39	0	0	0	INDIA
ABP News-CVoter	March 2024	±3-5%	39	0	0	0	INDIA
India Today-CVoter	February 2024	±3-5%	39	0	0	0	INDIA
Times Now-ETG	December 2023	±3%	30-36	0-1	3-6	0-2	INDIA
India TV-CNX	October 2023	±3%	32	1	5	1	INDIA
AIADMK leaves NDA
Times Now-ETG	September 2023	±3%	30-34	0-1	3-7	0-1	INDIA
Times Now-ETG	August 2023	±3%	30-34	0-1	3-7	0-1	INDIA
India Today-CVoter	August 2023	±3-5%	39	0	0	0	INDIA

Polling agency	Date published	Margin of error					Lead
Polling agency	Date published	Margin of error	INDIA	NDA	AIADMK	Others	Lead
ABP News-CVoter	March 2024	±3-5%	54.7%	10.9%	27.9%	6.8%	26.9
India Today-CVoter	February 2024	±3-5%	47%	15%	38%		9
AIADMK leaves NDA
India Today-CVoter	August 2023	±3-5%	53%	33%		14%	20

=== Telangana (17) ===
Polling agency	Date published	Margin of error					Lead
Polling agency	Date published	Margin of error	BRS	INDIA	NDA	Others	Lead
ABP News-CVoter	April 2024	±5%	1	10	5	1	INDIA
ABP News-CVoter	March 2024	±5%	3	10	4	1	INDIA
India Today-CVoter	February 2024	±3-5%	3	10	3	1	INDIA
ABP-CVoter	December 2023	±3-5%	3-5	9-11	1-3	1-2	INDIA
Times Now-ETG	December 2023	±3%	3-5	8-10	3-5	0-1	INDIA
India TV-CNX	October 2023	±3%	8	2	6	1	BRS
Times Now-ETG	September 2023	±3%	9-11	3-4	2-3	0-1	BRS
Times Now-ETG	August 2023	±3%	9-11	3-4	2-3	0-1	BRS
India Today-CVoter	August 2023	±3-5%	6	7	4	0	INDIA

Polling agency	Date published	Margin of error					Lead
Polling agency	Date published	Margin of error	BRS	INDIA	NDA	Others	Lead
ABP News-CVoter	April 2024	±5%	27%	42%	26%	5%	15
ABP News-CVoter	March 2024	±5%	28%	43%	25%	4%	15
India Today-CVoter	February 2024	±3-5%	29%	41%	21%	9%	12
India Today-CVoter	August 2023	±3-5%	37%	38%	23%	2%	1

=== Tripura (2) ===
Polling agency	Date published	Margin of error				Lead
Polling agency	Date published	Margin of error	NDA	INDIA	Others	Lead
ABP News-CVoter	March 2024	±5%	2	0	0	NDA
TMP joins NDA
Times Now-ETG	December 2023	±3%	2	0	0	NDA
India TV-CNX	October 2023	±3%	2	0	0	NDA
Times Now-ETG	September 2023	±3%	2	0	0	NDA
Times Now-ETG	August 2023	±3%	1-2	0-1	0	NDA

=== Uttar Pradesh (80) ===
Polling agency	Date published	Margin of error					Lead
Polling agency	Date published	Margin of error	NDA	INDIA	BSP	Others	Lead
ABP News-CVoter	March 2024	±5%	74	6	0	0	NDA
India Today-CVoter	February 2024	±3-5%	72	8	0	0	NDA
ABP News-CVoter	December 2023	±3-5%	73-75	4-6	0-2	0	NDA
Times Now-ETG	December 2023	±3%	70-74	4-8	0-1	1-3	NDA
India TV-CNX	October 2023	±3%	73	7	0	0	NDA
Times Now-ETG	September 2023	±3%	70-74	4-8	1-3	0-1	NDA
Times Now-ETG	August 2023	±3%	69-73	5-9	0-1	1-3	NDA
India Today-CVoter	August 2023	±3-5%	72	8	0	0	NDA
ABP News-Matrize	March 2023	±3%	67-73	1-2	0-4	3-6	NDA

Polling agency	Date published	Margin of error					Lead
Polling agency	Date published	Margin of error	NDA	INDIA	BSP	Others	Lead
ABP News-CVoter	March 2024	±5%	51%	35%	8%	6%	16
India Today-CVoter	February 2024	±3-5%	52%	36%	12%		16
India Today-CVoter	August 2023	±3-5%	49%	38%	13%		11

=== Uttarakhand (5) ===
Polling agency	Date published	Margin of error				Lead
Polling agency	Date published	Margin of error	NDA	INDIA	Others	Lead
ABP News-CVoter	March 2024	±5%	5	0	0	NDA
India Today-CVoter	February 2024	±3-5%	5	0	0	NDA
Times Now-ETG	December 2023	±3%	4-5	0-1	0	NDA
India TV-CNX	October 2023	±3%	5	0	0	NDA
Times Now-ETG	September 2023	±3%	4-5	0-1	0	NDA
Times Now-ETG	August 2023	±3%	4-5	0-1	0	NDA

Polling agency	Date published	Margin of error				Lead
Polling agency	Date published	Margin of error	NDA	INDIA	Others	Lead
ABP News-CVoter	March 2024	±5%	63%	35%	2%	28
India Today-CVoter	February 2024	±3-5%	59%	32%	9%	27

=== West Bengal (42) ===
Polling agency	Date published	Margin of error					Lead
Polling agency	Date published	Margin of error	AITC	NDA	SDA	Others	Lead
News18	March 2024	±4%	17	25	0	0	NDA
ABP News-CVoter	March 2024	±5%	23	19	0	0	AITC
India TV-CNX	March 2024	±3%	21	20	1	0	AITC
Zee News-Matrize	February 2024	±2%	24	17	1	0	AITC
India Today-CVoter	February 2024	±3-5%	22	19	1	0	AITC
Times Now-ETG	February 2024	±2%	26	15	1	0	AITC
ABP News-CVoter	December 2023	±3-5%	23-25	16-18	0-2	0	AITC
Times Now-ETG	December 2023	±3%	20-24	18-20	2-4	0	AITC
India TV-CNX	October 2023	±3%	30	10	2	0	AITC
Times Now-ETG	August 2023	±3%	22-24	16-18	0-3	0	AITC

Polling agency	Date published	Margin of error					Lead
Polling agency	Date published	Margin of error	AITC	NDA	SDA	Others	Lead
ABP News-CVoter	March 2024	±5%	42.5%	40.9%	17.6%		1.6

== Preferred candidate for prime minister ==
Polling Agency	Date published			
Polling Agency	Date published	Narendra Modi	Rahul Gandhi	Others/none/ can't say
ABP News-CVoter	April 2024	58%	16%	26%
The Hindu-CSDS-Lokniti	April 2024	48%	27%	25%
Times Now-ETG	April 2024	64%	17%	19%
News18	March 2024	69%	31%	0%
ABP News-CVoter	March 2024	62.7%	27.5%	9.8%
Times Now-ETG	February 2024	64%	17%	19%
India Today-CVoter	February 2024	54.9%	13.8%	31.3%
ABP News-CVoter	December 2023	58.6%	32%	9.4%
India Today-CVoter	August 2023	52%	16%	32%
Times Now-ETG	July 2023	64%	13%	23%
CSDS-Lokniti	May 2023	43.4%	26.8%	29.8%
TV9 Bharatvarsh-People's Insight - Polstrat	March 2023	58%	19.9%	22.1%
India Today-CVoter	January 2023	53%	14%	33%
India Today-CVoter	August 2022	53%	9%	38%
India TV-Matrize	July 2022	48%	11%	41%
India Today-CVoter	January 2022	52.5%	6.8%	40.7%
India Today-Karvy	August 2021	24%	10%	66%
India Today-Karvy	January 2021	38%	7%	55%
India Today-Karvy	August 2020	66%	8%	26%
ABP News-CVoter	January 2020	70%	25.4%	4.6%
India Today-Karvy	January 2020	53%	13%	34%

== Approval ratings ==
=== Union government ===
Polling firm	Date published	Approve	Disapprove	DK/NA	Strongly approve	Approve	Disapprove	Strongly disapprove	DK/NA	Net	Margin of error	Sample size
The Hindu-CSDS-Lokniti	April 2024	59%	39%	2%	23%	34%	19%	20%	2%	+20%	-	10,019
ABP News-CVoter	March 2024	70.67%	26.67%	2.66%	40.8%	29.87%	26.67%		2.66%	+44%	±5%	41,762
CSDS-Lokniti	May 2023	54.7%	40.2%	5.1%	17.0%	37.7%	19.4%	20.8%	5.1%	+14.5%	-	7,202

=== Prime Minister Narendra Modi's performance ===
Polling firm	Date published	Approve	Disapprove	DK/NA	Strongly approve	Approve	Disapprove	Strongly disapprove	DK/NA	Net	Margin of error	Sample size
ABP News-CVoter	March 2024	77.11%	21.47%	1.42%	51.41%	25.7%	21.47%		1.42%	+56%	±5%	41,762

== Exit polls ==
The Election Commission of India banned the publication of all exit polls starting 48 hours before Phase 1 of the election until the end of Phase 7. This was intended to prevent exit polls from earlier phases affecting voter decisions in later phases. The ban ended after the close of Phase 7 voting at 18:30 IST on 1 June 2024.

Polling agency				Lead
Polling agency	NDA	INDIA	Others	Lead
2019 election results	353	91	99	81
ABP News-CVoter	368±15	167±15	8±4	96
Agni News Services	242	264	37	HUNG
Dainik Bhaskar	316±34	173±28	41±8	44
DB Live	221±20	275±15	38±10	3
India Today-Axis My India	381±20	148±18	14±6	109
India News-Dynamics	371	125	47	99
India TV-CNX	386±15	134±15	33±5	96
NDTV-Jan Ki Baat	377±15	151±10	15±5	105
News18-CNBC	362±8	132±8	47±5	90
News 24-Today's Chanakya	400±15	107-11	36±9	128
News Nation	360±18	161±8	22±1	88
Republic TV-Matrize	360±8	126±8	30	88
Republic TV-PMarq	359	154	30	87
Times Now-ETG	358	152	33	86
TV9 Bharatvarsh - People's Insight - Polstrat	346	162	35	74
Pratik - Classifiction	265	265	13	HUNG
2024 election results	293	234	16	21

== Exit polls by states and union territories ==
=== Andaman and Nicobar Islands ===
Polling agency				Lead
Polling agency	NDA	INDIA	Others	Lead
Actual results	1	0	0	NDA

=== Andhra Pradesh ===
Polling agency					Lead
Polling agency	NDA	YSRCP	INDIA	Others	Lead
ABP News-CVoter	21-25	0-4	0	0	NDA
India Today-Axis My India	21-23	2-4	0	0	NDA
India News-Dynamics	18	7	0	0	NDA
India TV-CNX	19-23	3-5	0	0	NDA
NDTV-Jan Ki Baat	10-14	8-13	0	0	NDA
CNN-CNBC-News 18	19-22	5-8	0	0	NDA
News 24-Today's Chanakya	22	3	0	0	NDA
News Nation	19	6	0	0	NDA
Republic TV-Matrize	19-22	3-6	0	0	NDA
Republic TV-PMarq	14	11	0	0	NDA
Times Now-ETG	11	14	0	0	YSRCP
TV9 Bharatvarsh- People's Insight - Polstrat	12	13	0	0	YSRCP
Times Now-NavBharat	10	15	0	0	YSRCP
DB Live	7-9	15-17	0-2	0	YSRCP
Actual results	21	4	0	0	NDA

=== Arunachal Pradesh ===
Polling agency				Lead
Polling agency	NDA	INDIA	Others	Lead
India Today Axis My India	2	0	0	NDA
Pratik - Classification	1	1	0	TIED
Actual results	2	0	0	NDA

=== Assam ===
Polling agency					Lead
Polling agency	NDA	INDIA	AIUDF	Others	Lead
TV9 Bharatvarsh- People's Insight - Polstrat	12	1	0	1	NDA
Actual results	11	3	0	0	NDA

!Pratik - Classification !10 !4 !0 !0 |bgcolor=#FF9933 |NDA |-

=== Bihar ===
Polling agency				Lead
Polling agency	NDA	INDIA	Others	Lead
India Today Axis My India	29-33	7-10	0	NDA
DB Live	14-16	24-26	0	INDIA
Jan Ki Baat	33-37	3-7	0	NDA
News18	31-34	6-9	0	NDA
ABP C-Voter	35-38	3-5	0	NDA
TV9 Bharatvarsh- People's Insight - Polstrat	29	8	3	NDA
Pratik - Classification	28	12	0	NDA
2019 election results	39	1	0	NDA
Actual results	30	9	1	NDA

=== Chandigarh ===
Polling agency				Lead
Polling agency	NDA	INDIA	Others	Lead
Actual results	0	1	0	INDIA

=== Chhattisgarh ===
Polling agency				Lead
Polling agency	NDA	INDIA	Others	Lead
TV9 Bharatvarsh- People's Insight - Polstrat	11	0	0	NDA
Actual results	10	1	0	NDA

=== Dadra and Nagar Haveli and Daman and Diu ===
Polling agency				Lead
Polling agency	NDA	INDIA	Others	Lead
Actual results	1	0	1	Tie

=== Delhi ===
Polling agency				Lead
Polling agency	NDA	INDIA	Others	Lead
India Today-Axis My India	6-7	0-1	0	NDA
TV9 Bharatvarsh- People's Insight - Polstrat	7	0	0	NDA
Pratik- Classification	7	0	0	NDA
Actual results	7	0	0	NDA

=== Goa ===
Polling agency				Lead
Polling agency	NDA	INDIA	Others	Lead
TV9 Bharatvarsh- People's Insight - Polstrat	2	0	0	NDA
DB Live	1±1	1±1	0	Tie
2019 election	1	1	0	Tie
Actual results	1	1	0	Tie

=== Gujarat ===
Polling agency				Lead
Polling agency	NDA	INDIA	Others	Lead
TV9 Bharatvarsh- People's Insight - Polstrat	26	0	0	NDA
Pratik- Classification	24	2	0	NDA
Actual results	25	1	0	NDA

=== Haryana ===
Polling agency				Lead
Polling agency	NDA	INDIA	Others	Lead
TV9 Bharatvarsh- People's Insight - Polstrat	8	2	0	NDA
Actual results	5	5	0	Tie

=== Himachal Pradesh ===
Polling agency				Lead
Polling agency	NDA	INDIA	Others	Lead
TV9 Bharatvarsh- People's Insight - Polstrat	4	0	0	NDA
Actual results	4	0	0	NDA

=== Jammu and Kashmir ===
Polling agency				Lead
Polling agency	NDA	INDIA	Others	Lead
TV9 Bharatvarsh- People's Insight - Polstrat	2	2	1	Tie
Actual results	2	2	1	Tie

=== Jharkhand ===
Polling agency				Lead
Polling agency	NDA	INDIA	Others	Lead
TV9 Bharatvarsh- People's Insight - Polstrat	12	1	1	NDA
Actual results	9	5	0	NDA

=== Karnataka ===
Polling agency				Lead	
Polling agency	NDA	INDIA	Others	Lead	
ABP News	23-25	3-5	0	NDA	
India News-Dynamics	23	5	0	NDA	
India TV-CNX	20-24	4-8	0	NDA	
NDTV-Jan Ki Baat	19-25	4-8	0	NDA	
CNN-CNBC-News 18	19-22	6-9	0	NDA	
News 24-Today's Chanakya	20-28	0-8	0	NDA	
News Nation	18	10	0	NDA	
Republic TV-Matrize	21	7	0	NDA	
Republic Bharat-PMarq	22	6	0	NDA	
Times Now-ETG	23	5	0	NDA	
Pratik-Classification	18	10	0	style="color:black;"bgcolor="#F98C1F"	NDA
TV9 Bharatvarsh- People's Insight - Polstrat	20	8	0	NDA	
DB Live	8-10	18-20	0	INDIA	
Actual results	19	9	0	NDA	

=== Kerala ===
Polling agency					Lead
Polling agency	UDF	LDF	NDA	Others	Lead
ABP News-CVoter	17-19	0	1-3	0	UDF
India Today-Axis My India	17-18	0-1	1-3	0	UDF
India News-Dynamics	14-17	3-5	0-1	0	UDF
India TV-CNX	13-15	3-5	1-3	0	UDF
NDTV-Jan Ki Baat	14-17	3-5	0-1	0	UDF
CNN-CNBC-News 18	15-18	1-3	0	0	UDF
News 24-Today's Chanakya	15	1	4	0	UDF
News Nation	17-19	0	1-3	0	UDF
Republic TV-Matrize	17	3	0	0	UDF
Republic TV-PMarq	17	3	0	0	UDF
Times Now-ETG	14-15	4	1	0	UDF
Times Now-NavBharat	16-18	4	1	0	UDF
DB Live	17-19	2-3	0-1	0	UDF
TV9 Bharatvarsh- People's Insight - Polstrat			1		
Actual results	18	1	1	0	UDF

=== Ladakh ===
Polling agency				Lead
Polling agency	NDA	INDIA	Others	Lead
Actual results	0	0	1	Others

=== Lakshadweep ===
Polling agency				Lead
Polling agency	NDA	INDIA	Others	Lead
Actual results	0	1	0	INDIA

=== Madhya Pradesh ===
Polling agency				Lead
Polling agency	NDA	INDIA	Others	Lead
TV9 Bharatvarsh- People's Insight - Polstrat	29	0	0	NDA
Actual results	29	0	0	NDA

=== Maharashtra ===
Polling agency				Lead
Polling agency	NDA	INDIA	Others	Lead
TV9 Bharatvarsh- People's Insight - Polstrat	22	25	1	INDIA
Actual results	17	30	1	INDIA

=== Manipur ===
Polling agency				Lead
Polling agency	NDA	INDIA	Others	Lead
Actual results	0	2	0	INDIA

=== Meghalaya ===
Polling agency				Lead
Polling agency	NDA	INDIA	Others	Lead
Actual results	0	1	1	Tie

=== Mizoram ===
Polling agency					Lead
Polling agency	ZPM	NDA	INDIA	Others	Lead
Actual results	1	0	0	0	ZPM

=== Nagaland ===
Polling agency				Lead
Polling agency	NDA	INDIA	Others	Lead
Actual results	0	1	0	INDIA

=== Odisha ===
Polling agency					Lead
Polling agency	NDA	BJD	INDIA	Others	Lead
India Today-Axis My India	18-20	0-2	0-1	0	NDA
Jan Ki Baat	15-18	3-7	0	0	NDA
ABP-CVoter	17-19	1-3	0-2	0	NDA
India TV-CNX	15-17	4-6	0-1	0	NDA
News 24-Today's Chanakya	16	4	1	0	NDA
News Nation	14	6	1	0	NDA
Pratik - Classification	20	0	1	0	NDA
Dainik Bhaskar	14-15	6-7	0-1	0	NDA
DB Live	6–8	12-14	0–1	0	BJD
News18 Mega Exit Polls	13-15	6-8	0	0	NDA
India News-Dynamics	13	8	0	0	NDA
Times Now-ETG	13	8	0	0	NDA
Republic-PMarq	12	8	1	0	NDA
Republic Bharat-Matrize	9-12	7-10	0-1	0	NDA
TV9 Bharatvarsh- People's Insight - Polstrat	13	1		7	NDA
2019 results	8	12	1	0	BJD
Actual results	20	0	1	0	NDA

=== Puducherry ===
Polling agency				Lead
Polling agency	NDA	INDIA	Others	Lead
Actual results	0	1	0	INDIA

=== Punjab ===
Polling agency					Lead
Polling agency	INDIA	NDA	SAD	Others	Lead
DB Live	13	0	0	0	INDIA
TV9 Bharatvarsh- People's Insight - Polstrat	8	2	0	3	INDIA
2019 election	9	2	2	0	INDIA
Actual results	10	0	1	2	INDIA

=== Rajasthan ===
Polling agency				Lead
Polling agency	NDA	INDIA	Others	Lead
TV9 Bharatvarsh- People's Insight - Polstrat	19	5	1	NDA
Actual results	14	11	0	NDA

=== Sikkim ===
Polling agency					Lead
Polling agency	NDA	SDF	INDIA	Others	Lead
Actual results	1	0	0	0	NDA

=== Tamil Nadu ===
Polling agency					Lead
Polling agency	INDIA	NDA	AIADMK+	Others	Lead
TV9 Bharatvarsh- People's Insight - Polstrat	35	4			INDIA
Actual results	39	0	0	0	INDIA

=== Telangana ===
Polling agency					Lead
Polling agency	INDIA	NDA	BRS	Others	Lead
TV9 Bharatvarsh- People's Insight - Polstrat	8	7		2	INDIA
Actual results	8	8	0	1	Tie

=== Tripura ===
Polling agency				Lead
Polling agency	NDA	INDIA	Others	Lead
DB Live	0-2	0-2	0	Tie
India Today-Axis My India	2	0	0	NDA
2019 election	2	0	0	NDA
Actual results	2	0	0	NDA

=== Uttar Pradesh ===
Polling agency					Lead
Polling agency	NDA	INDIA	BSP	Others	Lead
Republic-PMarq	69	11	0	0	NDA
DB Live	46-48	32-34	0	0	NDA
IndiaNews Dynamics	69	11	0	0	NDA
India TV-CNX	62-68	12-16	0-1	0	NDA
India-Today Axis My India	64-67	13-16	0-1	0	NDA
Jan Ki Baat	68-74	6–12	0	0	NDA
News Nation	67	13	0	0	NDA
News24-Today's Chanakya	68	12	0	0	NDA
TV9 Bharatvarsh- People's Insight - Polstrat	65	15	0	0	NDA
2019 election	64	6	10	0	NDA
Actual results	36	43	0	1	INDIA

=== Uttarakhand ===
Polling agency				Lead
Polling agency	NDA	INDIA	Others	Lead
TV9 Bharatvarsh- People's Insight - Polstrat	5	0	0	NDA
Actual results	5	0	0	NDA

=== West Bengal ===
Polling agency					Lead
Polling agency	NDA	AITC	LF+INC	Others	Lead
ABP News-CVoter	23-27	13-17	1-3	0	NDA
DB Live	11-12	26-28	2-4	0	AITC
India Today- Axis My India	26-31	11-14	0-2	0	NDA
India News-Dynamics	21	19	2	0	NDA
India TV-CNX	22-26	14-18	1-2	0	NDA
NDTV-Jan Ki Baat	21-26	18-16	0-3	0	NDA
News 24-Today's Chanakya	24	17	1	0	NDA
News 18-CNBC	21-24	18-21	0	0	NDA
News Nation	19	22	1	0	AITC
Republic TV-Matrize	21-25	16-21	0	0	NDA
Republic TV-PMarq	22	20	0	0	NDA
Times Now-ETG	21	20	1	0	NDA
TV9 Bharatvarsh- People's Insight -Polstrat	21	20	1	0	NDA
2019 election	18	22	2	0	AITC
Actual results	12	29	1	0	AITC

== Reception ==
Media outlets known for their sycophanchy of the BJP were accused of exaggerating the scale of BJP's victory in their exit polls in an attempt to demoralise the Opposition campaign. Talking in a show of BBC Hindi, political strategist Yogendra Yadav described it as crowd manipulation orchestrated by the media and stated that had these media outlets been honest about the situation on ground, the BJP wouldn't have won even 200 seats (read Tinkerbell effect).

== See also ==
- 2024 Indian general election
- Politics in India
