= News Nation (disambiguation) =

NewsNation may refer to:

- News Nation, an Indian free to air Hindi news television channel
- News Nation Assam, television news station in India
- NewsNation, an American subscription television network
- NewsNation with Tamron Hall, an American weekday talk-news program that was broadcast on MSNBC
