= Barun Das =

Indian entrepreneur

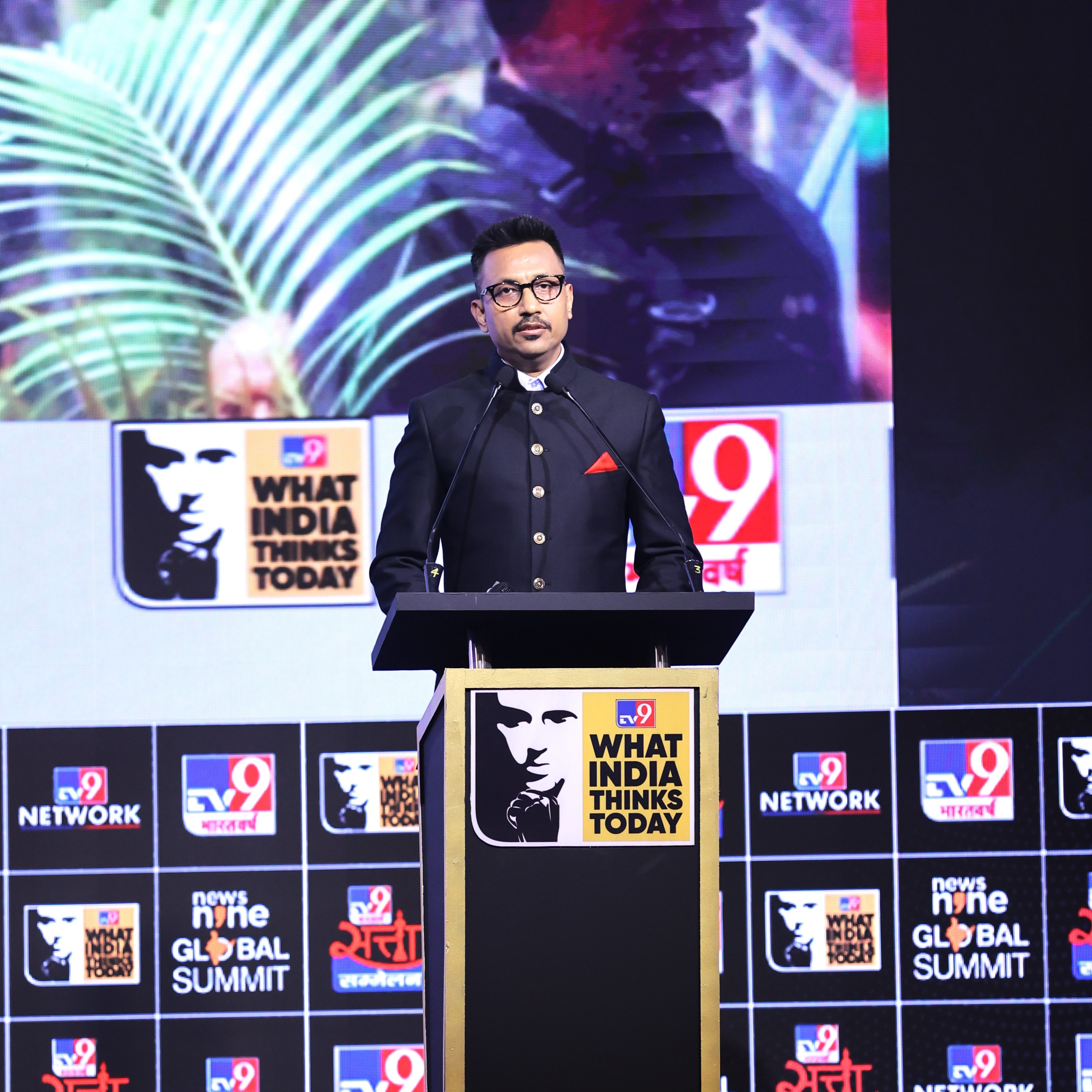
- Das delivering the welcome address for PM Narendra Modi during WITT 2024 (26 February 2024)
- Born: 15 November 1969 (age 56)
- Education: Indian Institute of Technology, Madras Indian Institute of Management, Calcutta London School of Economics
- Occupations: MD & CEO, TV9 Network
- Spouse: Sandipa Bhattacharya (m. 1994)
- Children: 1

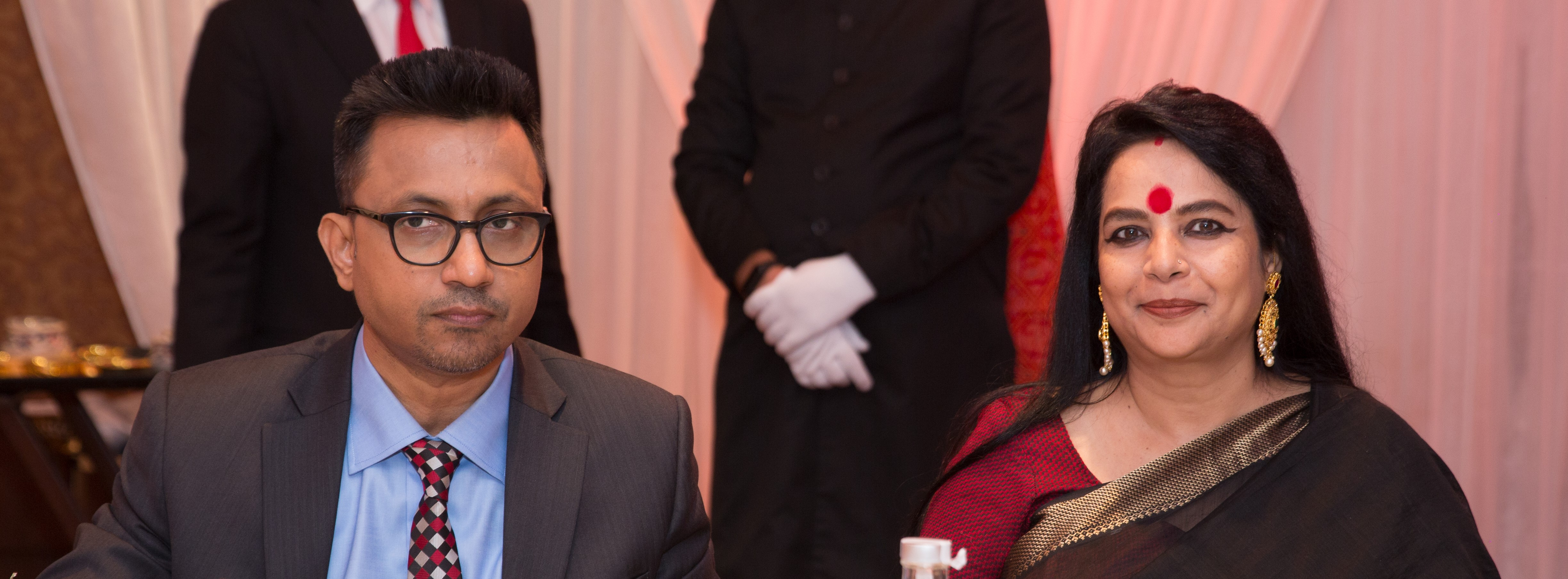
Das with his wife Dr Sandipa Bhattacharya in 2022

Barun Das (born 15 November 1969) is an Indian businessman and media personality, and the MD & CEO of TV9 Network (largest news network in India in terms of viewership numbers). He is an alumnus of IIT Madras, IIM Calcutta and London School of Economics. He has over 25 years of experience in the Media sector, both in India and abroad – in top managerial positions. Das was a member of the International Academy of Television Arts and Sciences and was a juror for the finals of the International Emmys. A strategist from an early age, Das was selected for Junior National Bridge team.

Das was conferred with Honorary Doctorate in Philosophy by Manav Rachna International Institute of Research and Studies in April 2023.

== Career ==
His last corporate assignment, before TV9, was with Zee News Ltd. (currently Zee Media Corporation Ltd), being the youngest CEO of any news network in India. Prior to this, he held top management posts at MCCS (owner of the erstwhile Star group's news operations in India), India Today Group, ABP Group, and Head of International Business at Astro All Asia, Networks Plc. Kuala Lumpur.

After his stint in Zee, Barun dipped his toe in entrepreneurship and started Mydia100 Communications Pvt. Ltd., focusing on convergence of technology, content and healthcare, which was later acquired by TV9 Network.

In the short stint with TV9 Network, he has led TV9 Bharatvarsh to No.1 position in the BARC ratings as in March 2022. He was named the managing director of TV9 Network in June 2022.

Barun is known for his out of the box thinking. Under his leadership, TV9 Network, has experimented with various disruptive ideas. Money9, which is India's first multilingual personal finance platform and News9 Plus, which is India's first video magazine OTT service was launched under his leadership.

TV9 Network conducted their inaugural Global summit - What India Thinks Today in June 2022. 75 speakers across domains discussed India's position in the new international order. Former UK Prime Minister David Cameron was interviewed by Das in this edition.

== Duologue with Barun Das ==
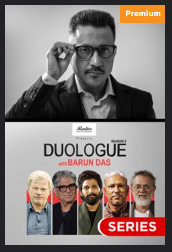
Series Poster of Duologue Season 2 on News9 Plus

In 2022, News9 Plus launched a new format of discussions called Duologue with Barun Das. The idea is to get up close and personal with celebrated people from different domain. Styled similar to The David Letterman Show, this is a conversation between Das and a legend. It unfolds the life and theories of both the host and the guest.

Das hosted 8 notable guests in season 1 which included the former UK Prime Minister David Cameron, Padma Awardees Narayan and Sudha Murty along with other legends across domains. Media legend Arnab Goswami said, "Barun has an easy-going and yet razor-sharp conversational style. He got me to open up on subjects I’ve been quiet about, and I’m glad we ‘duologued’ like I haven’t before."

In Season 2 he has further had conversations with 5 more guests in the first drop. The second season was directed by notable actress Arpita Chatterjee.

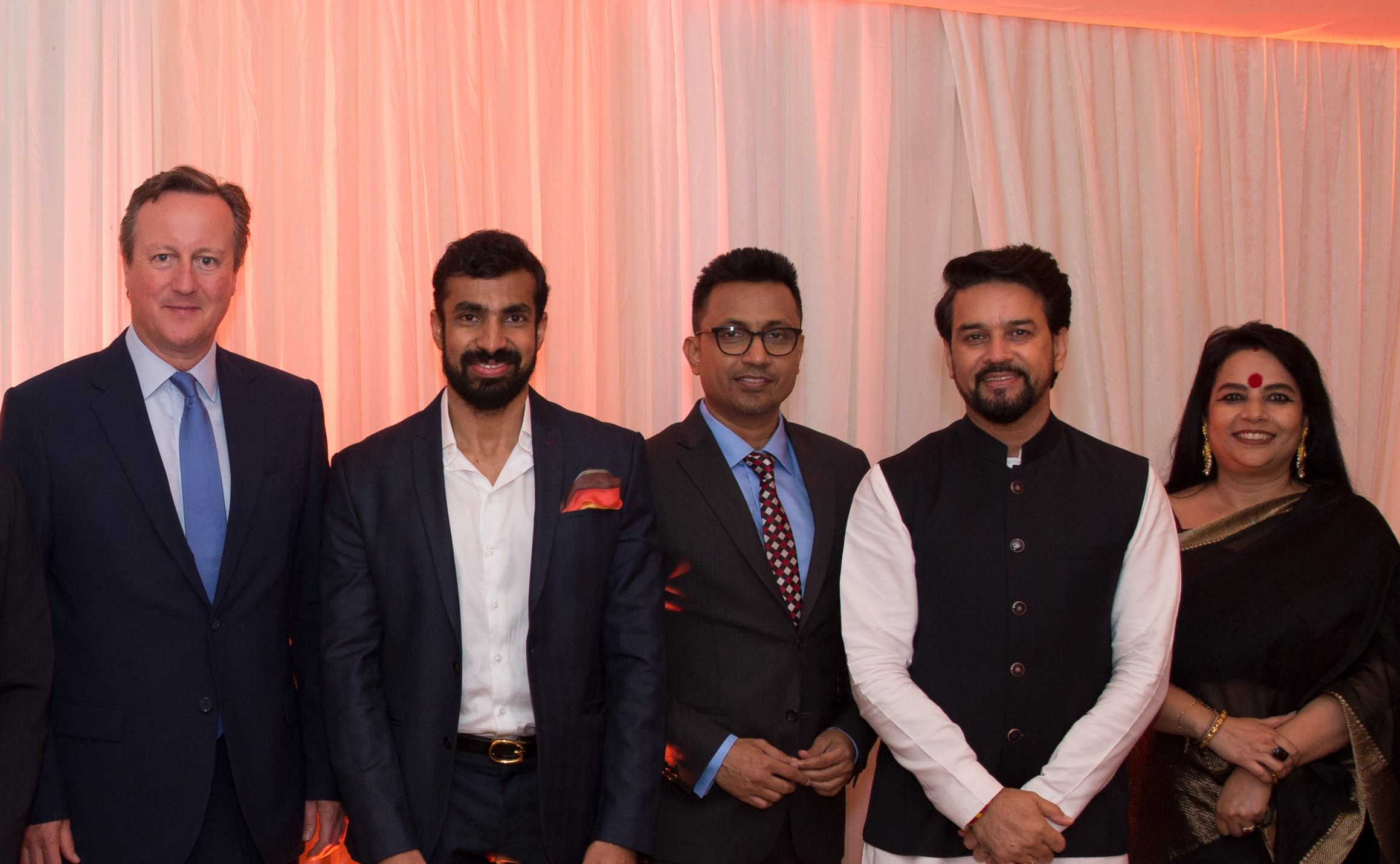
Barun Das and his wife Dr Sandipa Bhattacharya with former UK PM David Cameron and Indian IB minister Anurag Thakur

S.no	In Conversation With	
	Season 1	Season 2
1.	Vijay Deverakonda	Oliver Kahn
2.	David Cameron	Deepak Chopra
3.	Arnab Goswami	Allu Arjun
4.	Subhash Chandra	Jeev Milkha Singh
5.	Mithali Raj	Rakeysh Omprakash Mehra
6.	Sadhguru	
7.	N. R. Narayana Murthy & Sudha Murty	
8.	Devi Shetty	

== Recognition ==
- Asia's Transformational Leader - Ideafest 2023
- Honorary Doctorate in Philosophy - Manav Rachna International Institute of Research and Studies
- World's Best Leader - WCRCLeaders Global Summit
