= TV9 Bharatvarsh =

Television news channel

- TV9 Bharatvarsh icon
- Country: India
- Broadcast area: Nationwide
- Network: TV9 Network
- Headquarters: Noida, Uttar Pradesh, India

Programming
- Language: Hindi
- Picture format: 16:9 (1080i, news portal)

Ownership
- Owner: Associated Broadcasting Company Private Limited (ABCPL)
- Key people: Barun Das (CEO)
- Sister channels: TV9 Bangla; TV9 Telugu; TV9 Kannada; TV9 Marathi; TV9 Gujarati

History
- Launched: 30 March 2019; 7 years ago

Links
- Webcast: Watch Live
- Website: tv9hindi.com

TV9 Bharatvarsh is an Indian Hindi-language news channel owned by the TV9 Network. Launched on 30 March 2019, it became one of the most viewed Hindi news channels in India within a year. TV9 Bharatvarsh appointed Barun Das as CEO in 2019. It has been doing 24/7 coverage of the 2022 Russian invasion of Ukraine.

TV9 Network, also launched Money9, a multilingual personal finance OTT Channel with seven language options in Hindi, English, Bangla, Telugu, Marathi, Gujarati and Kannada.

== Programming ==
TV9 Bharatvarsh broadcasts news programs covering national and international news, politics, business, sports, and entertainment. Its programming includes news bulletins, debates, and special reports. The channel also distributes content through digital platforms such as its website and social media channels.

== Digital presence ==
TV9 Bharatvarsh maintains an online presence through a website and mobile applications, offering news articles, videos, and live streaming.

== Controversies ==
TV9 Bharatvarsh has faced criticism for its coverage style and editorial choices. Media analysts and watchdog groups have noted instances of sensationalism and criticized the channel for prioritizing viewership over balanced reporting.

In 2021, the channel was included in discussions around perceived political bias in Indian Hindi news media, particularly concerning coverage of election-related events. Critics have accused several channels, including TV9 Bharatvarsh, of leaning towards "Godi media" pro-Narendra Modi political narratives.

The News Broadcasters and Digital Association (NBSA), the self-regulatory body for news channels in India, has received complaints regarding content aired on TV9 Bharatvarsh but no major sanctions have been reported.
