= ETG Research =

Indian election pollster

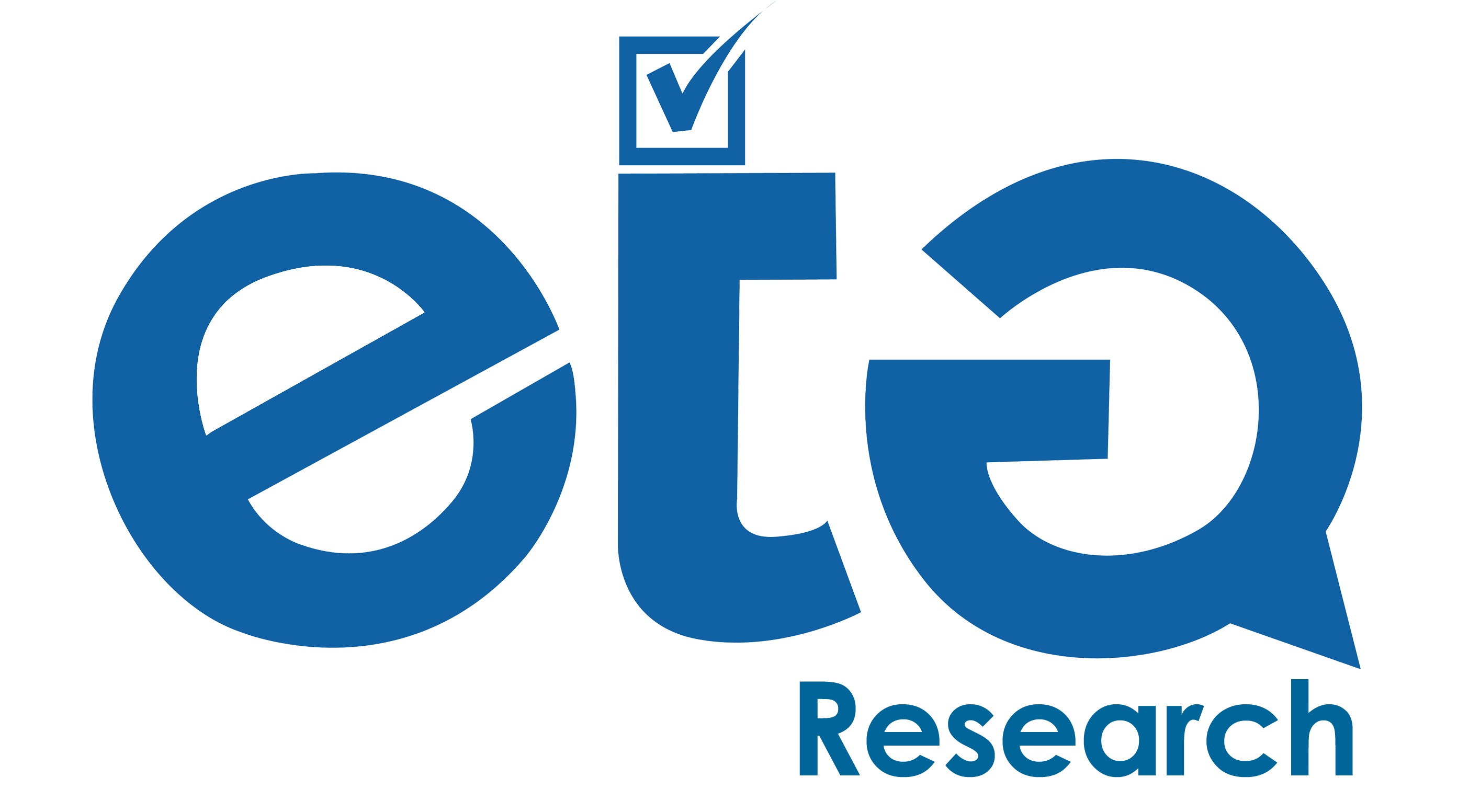
- Website: www.etgresearch.in

ETG Research is a reputed polling firm that tracks Indian elections and publishes their findings. The firm has worked in Bihar, West Bengal, Goa, Punjab, Uttarakhand, Uttar Pradesh, Gujarat, Himachal Pradesh, Nagaland, Meghalaya, Tripura & Karnataka Assembly Elections.

== 2023 State Assembly Elections ==
=== Karnataka Legislative Assembly Election 2023 ===
Exit Poll
Polling Agency	INC	BJP	JDS	OTHERS
Times Now - ETG Research	106 - 120 40.9%	78 - 92 36.7%	20 - 26 16.1%	2 - 4 6.3%

=== Tripura Legislative Assembly Election 2023 ===
Exit Poll
Polling Agency	BJP+IPFT	LEFT + INC	TIPRA	OTHERS
Times Now - ETG Research	21 - 27 37.2%	18 - 24 36.8%	12 - 17 21.6%	1 - 2 4.4%

=== Meghalaya Legislative Assembly Election 2023 ===
Exit Poll
Polling Agency	NPP	TMC	UDP	BJP	INC	PDF	VPP	OTHERS
Times Now - ETG Research	18 - 26 24.7%	8 - 14 16.9%	8 - 14 14.2%	3 - 6 12.8%	2 -5 12.4%	2 - 4 6.1%	1 - 2 1.6%	1 - 3 11.3%

=== Nagaland Legislative Assembly Election 2023 ===
Exit Poll
Polling Agency	NDPP	BJP	NPF	LJP	NPP	NCP	JDU	OTHERS
Times Now - ETG Research	27 - 33 35.9%	12 - 16 17.6%	4 - 8 12.6%	2 - 5 7.9%	2 - 3 7.8%	1 - 4 4.9%	0 - 2 4.4%	1 - 3 8.9%
