= News Nation TV =

Indian news channel

News Nation
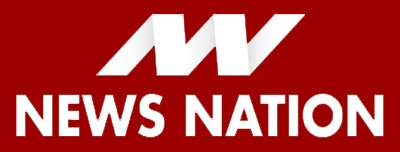
- Country: India
- Broadcast area: India
- Network: Broadcast television and online
- Headquarters: Noida, Uttar Pradesh, India

Programming
- Language: Hindi
- Picture format: 1080p HDTV (downscaled to 16:9 576i for the SDTV feed)

Ownership
- Owner: News Nation Network Pvt. Ltd./Yash Raj Films

History
- Launched: 12 February 2013

Links
- Website: newsnationtv.com

Availability

Streaming media
- News Nation Live TV: Watch Live

News Nation is an Indian free to air Hindi-language television news channel. News Nation is owned by News Nation Network Pvt Ltd./Yash Raj Films

In September 2022, journalist Anil Yadav resigned from the channel saying that there is pressure from the Uttar Pradesh government to cover up government scams, to run shows which have a "Hindu-Muslim agenda" and criticize only the politicians of other parties. He further alleged that the channel gets Rs. 17-18 crore a year from the government and that's why News Nation can't report against the Bharatiya Janata Party.

== Network ==
The network has a bouquet of TV channels, with News Nation being the flagship national Channel in Hindi, other regional channels include:

- News State Uttar Pradesh/Uttarakhand: News Nation Network's first regional Hindi news channel launched in 2014. It has news from all 88 districts of Uttar Pradesh and Uttarakhand, besides covering major stories from major cities and towns.
- News State Madhya Pradesh/ Chhattisgarh: In 2018, News Nation Network launched its second regional Hindi news channel for Madhya Pradesh and Chhattisgarh.
- News State Maharashtra Goa, a Free To Air (FTA) Marathi-language news channel for the audience of Maharashtra and Goa was launched in 2022. It was shut down after one year of airing due to less increment in TRP. However, it was relaunched as YouTube channel 2024.

== See also ==
- List of television stations in India
- News Nation Assam
- Godi media
