= Deshbandhu (newspaper) =

Indian newspaper

- Founder: Mayaram Surjan
- Founded: 17 April 1959
- Language: Hindi
- Website: www.deshbandhu.co.in

Deshbandhu (Hindi: देशबंधु, romanized: Deśabandhu, lit. 'The Friend of the Country') is a Hindi newspaper. It was launched on 17 April 1959 from Raipur, now capital of Chhattisgarh, by veteran journalist Mayaram Surjan. In 2008, Deshbandhu started its National Edition from New Delhi, becoming the first newspaper in central India to achieve this feat. Today Deshbandhu is published from 8 cities: Raipur, Bilaspur, Bhopal, Jabalpur, Sagar, Satna and New Delhi.

In addition, the group also publishes a broadsheet Hindi eveninger – Highway Channel – from Raipur, Bilaspur and Jagdalpur; a monthly literary journal – Akshar Parv; and also reference books from time to time.

Deshbandhu promoted and set up several public service institutions, namely Deshbandhu Pratibha Protsahan Kosh, Mayaram Surjan Foundation and Jandarshan Media Centre.
