= CVoter =

Indian polling agency

Centre for Voting Opinions and Trends in Election Research, or CVoter, is an Indian international polling agency headquartered in Delhi, India.

== History ==
Yashwant Deshmukh is the director and founding editor of CVoter.

== Clients ==
CVoter India states that it has covered 15 union budgets, more than 100 state elections and more than 30 international events. Since 2000 it has worked with Times Now, ANN7, United Press International, Reuters, Bloomberg News, BBC News, Aaj Tak, ABP News, Zee News, Zee Business, the Development and Educational Communication Unit of the Indian Space Research Organisation, India TV, Lok Sabha TV, UTVi business news channel (owned by UTV Software Communications), Sahara Samay (owned by Sahara India Pariwar), Jain TV, Asianet, ETV, CNEB and other news and information providers. Studies have included market research, conflict resolution research, and opinion polls.

== 2022 State Elections ==
=== Goa ===
Opinion polls

Date Published	Polling agency						Lead	Remarks
Date Published	Polling agency	NDA	UPA	AAP	AITC+	Others	Lead	Remarks
7 February 2022	ABP News C-voter	14-18	10-14	4-8	3-7	0-2	0-8	Hung
10 January 2022	ABP News C-voter	19-23	4-8	5-9	2-6	0-4	10-18	Hung
11 December 2021	ABP News C-Voter	17-21	4-8	5-9	6-10		7-15	Hung
12 November 2021	ABP News C-voter	19-23	2-6	3-7	8-12		7-15	Hung
8 October 2021	ABP News C-voter	24-28	1-5	3-7	4-8		16-24	BJP majority
3 Sept 2021	ABP News C-voter	22-26	3-7	4-8	3-7		14-22	BJP majority
10 March 2022	Election results	20	12	2	2	4	8	Hung

Exit polls

Polling agency						Lead	Remarks
Polling agency	NDA	UPA	AAP	AITC+	Others	Lead	Remarks
ABP-CVoter	13-17	12-16	1-5	5-9	0-2	0-1	Hung
Election results	20	12	2	2	4	8	Hung

=== Manipur ===
Opinion polls

Date Published	Polling agency					Lead	Remarks
Date Published	Polling agency	INC	BJP	NPF	Others	Lead	Remarks
10 January 2022	ABP News C-Voter	22-26	23-27	2-6	5-9	0-5	Hung
11 December 2021	ABP News C-Voter	23-27	29-33	2-6	0-2	2-10	Hung
12 November 2021	ABP News C-Voter	20-24	25-29	4-8	3-7	1-9	Hung
8 October 2021	ABP News C-Voter	21-25	26-30	4-8	1-5	1-9	Hung
3 September 2021	ABP News C-Voter	18-22	32-36	2-6	0-4	10-18	BJP majority
10 March 2022	Election results	5	32	5	18	14	NDA majority

Exit polls

Polling agency						Lead	Remarks
Polling agency	BJP	INC	NPP	NPF	Others	Lead	Remarks
ABP News-CVoter	23-27	12-16	10-14	3-7	2-6	7-15	Hung
Election results	32	5	7	5	11	21	NDA majority

=== Punjab ===
Opinion Polls

Date published	Polling agency						Lead	Remarks
Date published	Polling agency	UPA	AAP	SAD+	NDA	Others	Lead	Remarks
7 February 2022	ABP News - C-Voter	24-30	55-63	20-26	3-11	0-2	25-39	Hung
10 January 2022	ABP News - C-Voter	37-43	52-58	17-23	1-3	0-1	9-21	Hung
11 December 2021	ABP News - C-Voter	39-45	50-56	17-23	0-3	0-1	5-16	Hung
12 November 2021	ABP News - C-Voter	42-50	47-53	16-24	0-1	0-1	0-11	Hung
8 October 2021	ABP News - C-Voter	39-47	49-55	17-25	0-1	0-1	2-16	Hung
4 September 2021	ABP News - C-Voter	38-46	51-57	16-24	0-1	0-1	5-19	Hung
19 March 2021	ABP News - C-Voter	43-49	51-57	12-18	0-3	0-5	2-14	Hung
10 March 2022	Election results	18	92	4	2	1	74	AAP Majority

Exit polls

Polling agency						Lead	Remarks
Polling agency	UPA	AAP	SAD+	NDA	Others	Lead	Remarks
ABP News - C Voter	22-28	51-61	20-26	7-13	1-5	23-39	Hung
Election results	18	92	4	2	1	74	AAP Majority

=== Uttar Pradesh ===
Opinion polls

	Polling agency	NDA						Lead	Remarks
Date Published	Polling agency	NDA	SP+	BSP	UPA	Others		Lead	Remarks
18 March 2021	ABP-CVoter	284-294	54-64	33-43	1-7	10-16	220-240	NDA majority	
3 September 2021	ABP-CVoter	259-267	109-117	12-16	3-7	6-10	142-158	NDA majority	
8 October 2021	ABP-CVoter	241-249	130-138	15-19	3-7	0-4	103-119	NDA majority	
13 November 2021	ABP-CVoter	213-221	152-160	16-20	6-10	NA	53-69	NDA majority	
11 December 2021	ABP-CVoter	212-224	151-163	12-24	2-10	2-6	49-73	NDA majority	
10 January 2022	ABP-CVoter	223-235	145-157	8-16	3-7	4-8	66-90	NDA majority	
10 March 2022	Election results	273	125	1	2	2	178	NDA majority	

Exit polls

	NDA						Lead	Remarks
	NDA	SP+	BSP	UPA	Others		Lead	Remarks
ABP News - CVoter	228-244	132-148	13-21	4-8	NA	80-112	NDA majority	
Election results	273	125	1	2	2	178	NDA majority	

=== Uttarakhand ===
Opinion polls

Date	Polling agency					Lead	Remarks
Date	Polling agency	NDA	UPA	AAP	Others	Lead	Remarks
7 February 2022	ABP News - C-Voter	31-37	30-36	2-4	0-1	0-7	Hung
10 January 2022	ABP News - C-Voter	31-37	30-36	2-4	0-1	0-7	Hung
11 December 2021	ABP News - C-Voter	33-39	29-35	1-3	0-1	0-10	Hung
12 November 2021	ABP News - C-Voter	36-40	30-34	0-2	0-1	2-10	BJP majority
8 October 2021	ABP News - C-Voter	42-46	21-25	0-4	0-2	17-25	BJP majority
3 September 2021	ABP News - C-Voter	44-48	19-23	0-4	0-2	21-29	BJP majority
18 March 2021	ABP News - C-Voter	24-30	32-38	2-8	0-9	2-14	Hung
10 March	Election results	47	19	0	4	28	NDA majority

Exit polls

Polling agency					Lead	Remarks
Polling agency	NDA	UPA	AAP	Others	Lead	Remarks
ABP News C-Voter	26-32	32-38	0-2	3-7	0-12	Hung
Election results	47	19	0	4	28	NDA majority

== 2021 State Elections (West Bengal, Tamil Nadu, Kerala, Assam & Puducherry) ==
=== Assam ===
Poll type	Date published	Polling agency				Lead	Ref.
Poll type	Date published	Polling agency	NDA	Mahajot	Others	Lead	Ref.
Exit poll	29 April 2021	ABP News- CVoter	58-71	53-66	0-5	Hung	
Exit poll	29 April 2021	Times Now-CVoter	65	59	2	6	
Opinion poll	24 March 2021	Times Now-CVoter	65-73	52-60	0-4	5-21	
Opinion poll	24 March 2021	ABP News- CVoter	65-73	52-60	0-4	5-21	
Opinion poll	15 March 2021	ABP News- CVoter	64-72	52-60	0-2	4-20	
Opinion poll	8 March 2021	Times Now-CVoter	67	57	2	10	
Opinion poll	27 February 2021	ABP News- CVoter	68-76	47-55	0-3	13-29	
Opinion poll	18 January 2021	ABP News- CVoter	73-81	41-49	0-4	24-40	

Election Results
Election Results	Date published	Election Results				Lead	Ref.
Election Results	Date published	Election Results	NDA	Mahajot	Independent	Lead	Ref.
Election Results	2 May 2021	Election Results	75	50	1	25	

=== Kerala ===
Type of polls	Date published	Polling agency				Lead	Ref.
Type of polls	Date published	Polling agency	LDF	UDF	NDA	Lead	Ref.
Opinion Poll	24 March 2021	Mathrubhumi–CVoter	73–83	56–66	0–1	2–12	
Opinion Poll	24 March 2021	Times Now–CVoter	77	62	1	6	
Opinion Poll	19 March 2021	Mathrubhumi News–CVoter	75-83 (79)	55–60 (57)	0–2 (1)	4–12 (8)	
Opinion Poll	15 March 2021	ABP News–CVoter	77–85	54–62	0–2	6–14	
Opinion Poll	8 March 2021	Times Now–CVoter	82	56	1	11	
Opinion Poll	27 February 2021	ABP News–CVoter	83–91	47–55	0–2	12–20	
Opinion Poll	18 January 2021	ABP News–CVoter	81–89	41–47	0–2	10–18	
Exit polls	29 April 2021	Times Now / ABP - C-Voter	71 - 77	62 - 68	0 - 2	1 - 6	

Election Results
Election Results	Date published	Election Results				Lead	Ref.
Election Results	Date published	Election Results	LDF	UDF	NDA	Lead	Ref.
Election Results	2 May 2021	Election Results	99	41	0	58	

=== Tamil Nadu ===
Election outcome projections as surveyed by various agencies prior to the election day
Type of Poll	Date published	Polling agency							Lead
Type of Poll	Date published	Polling agency	DMK+	AIADMK+	AMMK+	MNM+	NTK	Others (Note: May include NTK and other parties not asked in survey)	Lead
Opinion Poll	24 Mar 21	Times Now - CVoter	177	49	3	3	–	2	128
Opinion Poll	15 Mar 21	ABP News - CVoter	161 - 169	53 - 61	1 - 5	2 - 6	–	3 - 7	100 - 116
Opinion Poll	8 Mar 21	Times Now- CVoter	158	65	–	–	–	–	88- 104
Opinion Poll	27 Feb 21	ABP News- CVoter	154 - 162	58 - 66	1 - 5	2 - 6	–	5 - 9	88- 104
Opinion Poll	18 Jan 21	ABP News- CVoter	158 - 166	60 - 68	2 - 6	0 - 4	–	0 - 4	90 - 106
Exit polls	29 Apr 21	ABP/Times Now - CVoter	160 - 172	58 - 70	0 - 4	0 - 2	0 - 3		90 - 114

Election Results
Election Results	Date published	Election Results							Lead
Election Results	Date published	Election Results	DMK+	AIADMK+	AMMK+	MNM+	NTK	Others	Lead
Election Results	2 May 2021	Election Results	159	75	0	0	0		84

=== West Bengal ===
Type of poll	Date published	Polling agency					Lead
Type of poll	Date published	Polling agency	AITC+	BJP+	SM	Others	Lead
Opinion Poll	24 March 2021	Times Now C-Voter	152-168	104-120	18-26	0-2	32-64
Opinion Poll	15 March 2021	ABP News - C Voter	150-166	98-114	23-31	3-5	36-52
Opinion Poll	8 March 2021	Times Now - C Voter	146-162	99-112	29-37	0	31-63
Opinion Poll	27 February 2021	ABP News - C Voter	148-164	92-108	31-39	1-5	40-72
Opinion Poll	18 January 2021	ABP News - CVoter	158	102	30	4	56
Exit poll	29 April 2021	ABP News - C-Voter	152-164	109-121	14-25	-	31-55

Election Results
Election Results	Date published	Election Results					Lead
Election Results	Date published	Election Results	AITC+	BJP+	SM	Others	Lead
Election Results	2 May 2021	Election Results	215	77	1	1	138

== 2021 Desh Ka Mood by Team Cvoter & ABP News ==
ABP News-CVoter gauges the nation's sentiments with ‘Desh ka Mood’ Survey

58% of people favor NDA government, 28% favor UPA: ABP News’ Desh Ka Mood survey

Naveen country's best CM

== 2020 Trust on Media Institutions ==
CVoter carried out a survey Trust on Indian media institutions

Indian readers place higher credibility to newspapers, survey finds

== 2020 Bihar elections ==
Bihar Assembly polls: It had projected 104-128 seats for the NDA and 108-131 seats for the opposition grand alliance. NDA secured a total of 125 seats (37.26% votes) while MGB won 110 seats (37.23% votes).

Polling type	Date	Polling Agency					Majority	Ref
Polling type	Date	Polling Agency	NDA	MGB	LJP	Others	Majority	Ref
Opinion poll
Opinion poll	24 October 2020	ABP-CVoter	135-159	77-98	5-13		13-37	
Opinion poll	12 October 2020	Times Now-CVoter	160	76	7		39	
Opinion poll	25 September 2020	ABP-CVoter	141-161	64-84	13-23		20–40	
Exit poll								
Exit poll		Times Now-CVoter	116	120	1	6	HUNG	
Exit poll		ABP News-CVoter	104-128	108-131	1-3	4-8	HUNG	
Election Results	10 November 2020		125	110	1	7	NDA	

== 2021 State Elections (West Bengal, Tamil Nadu, Kerala, Assam) ==
May 2016 saw elections in Bengal, Assam, Tamil Nadu and Kerala. CVoter was the only one of five polling agencies to predict the Tamil Nadu outcome correctly.

== 2016 United States elections ==
The UPI/CVoter poll wrongly predicted a Hillary Clinton victory in the 2016 United States presidential election. When the results were declared Donald Trump won the election.

2016 United States presidential election
Agency	Prediction	Actual Winner	Prediction accuracy
UPI/CVoter	Hillary Clinton	Donald Trump	Wrong

Poll source	Date	Hillary Clinton Democratic	Donald Trump Republican	Leading by %	Sample size	Margin of error
UPI/CVoter	1 – 7 November 2016	48.7%	46.2%	2.5	1,728	± 3.0%
UPI/CVoter	30 October – 5 November 2016	49%	46%	3	1,572	± 3.0%
UPI/CVoter	29 October – 4 November 2016	49%	48%	1	1,497	± 3.0%
UPI/CVoter	28 October – 3 November 2016	49%	48%	1	1,395	± 3.0%
UPI/CVoter	27 October – 2 November 2016	49%	48%	1	1,329	± 3.0%
UPI/CVoter	26 October – 1 November 2016	49%	48%	1	1,383	±3.0%
UPI/CVoter	24–30 October 2016	49%	48%	1	1,299	±3.0%
UPI/CVoter	23–29 October 2016	48%	48%	Tied	1,317	± 3.0%
UPI/CVoter	20–26 October 2016	49%	47%	2	1,363	± 3.0%
UPI/CVoter	19–25 October 2016	49%	47%	2	1,349	± 3.0%
UPI/CVoter	17–23 October 2016	49%	46%	3	1,414	± 3.0%
UPI/CVoter	11–17 October 2016	51%	46%	5	1,326	± 3.0%
UPI/CVoter	10–16 October 2016	50%	46%	4	1,325	± 3.0%
UPI/CVoter	7–13 October 2016	50%	45%	5	1,482	± 3.0%
UPI/CVoter	4–10 October 2016	50%	44%	6	1,367	± 3.0%
UPI/CVoter	3–9 October 2016	49%	44%	5	1,801	± 3.0%
UPI/CVoter	30 September – 6 October 2016	48%	47%	1	1,774	± 3.0%
UPI/CVoter	28 September – 4 October 2016	47%	48%	1	1,274	± 3.0%
UPI/CVoter	26 September – 2 October 2016	47%	49%	2	1,285	± 3.0%
UPI/CVoter	23–29 September 2016	47%	49%	2	1,236	± 3.0%
UPI/CVoter	21–27 September 2016	48%	48%	Tied	1,239	± 3.0%
UPI/CVoter	19–25 September 2016	48%	47%	1	1,052	± 3.0%
UPI/CVoter	12–18 September 2016	48%	47%	1	1,203	± 3.0%
UPI/CVoter	10–16 September 2016	47%	47%	Tied	1,246	± 3.0%
UPI/CVoter	9–15 September 2016	47%	48%	1	1,229	± 3.0%
UPI/CVoter	8–14 September 2016	47%	48%	1	1,265	± 3.0%
UPI/CVoter	7–13 September 2016	47%	48%	1	1,245	± 3.0%
UPI/CVoter	6–12 September 2016	46%	49%	3	1,232	± 3.0%
UPI/CVoter	5–11 September 2016	46%	49%	3	1,260	± 3.0%
UPI/CVoter	2–8 September 2016	46%	48%	2	1,256	± 3.0%
UPI/CVoter	1–7 September 2016	47%	48%	1	1,226	± 3.0%
UPI/CVoter	31 August – 6 September 2016	47%	47%	Tied	1,262	± 3.0%
UPI/CVoter	30 August – 5 September 2016	48%	46%	2	1,220	± 3.0%
UPI/CVoter	29 August – 4 September 2016	49%	47%	2	1,237	± 3.0%
UPI/CVoter	28 August – 3 September 2016	49%	46%	3	1,242	± 3.0%
UPI/CVoter	24–30 August 2016	49%	46%	3	1,162	± 3.0%
UPI/CVoter	23–29 August 2016	50%	47%	3	1,173	± 3.0%
UPI/CVoter	22–28 August 2016	50%	47%	3	1,145	± 3.0%
UPI/CVoter	21–27 August 2016	50%	47%	3	1,682	± 3.0%
UPI/CVoter	18–24 August 2016	48%	49%	1	1,720	± 3.0%
UPI/CVoter	17–23 August 2016	48%	48%	Tied	1,737	± 3.0%
UPI/CVoter	16–22 August 2016	48%	48%	Tied	1,752	± 3.0%
UPI/CVoter	15–21 August 2016	48%	47%	1	1,795	± 3.0%
UPI/CVoter	14–20 August 2016	48%	47%	1	1,191	± 3.0%
UPI/CVoter	11–17 August 2016	50%	46%	4	1,009	± 3.0%
UPI/CVoter	9–16 August 2016	51%	44%	7	1,069	± 3.0%
UPI/CVoter	9–15 August 2016	51%	44%	7	1,035	± 3.0%
UPI/CVoter	7–14 August 2016	50%	45%	5	975	± 3.0%
UPI/CVoter	7–13 August 2016	49%	46%	3	1,403	± 3.0%
UPI/CVoter	3–10 August 2016	49%	45%	4	1,077	± 3.0%
UPI/CVoter	3–9 August 2016	48%	46%	2	1,002	± 3.0%
UPI/CVoter	2–8 August 2016	49%	45%	4	993	± 3.0%
UPI/CVoter	1–7 August 2016	49%	44%	5	1,407	± 3.0%
UPI/CVoter	31 July – 6 August 2016	50%	43%	7	1,036	± 3.0%
UPI/CVoter	29 July – 4 August 2016	50%	44%	6	1,060	± 3.0%
UPI/CVoter	27 July – 2 August 2016	49%	46%	3	989	± 3.0%

== 2009 Indian general elections ==
The CVoter exit poll projections for India TV showed the UPA with 189–201 seats. It gives the Congress 149–155, the DMK between 9 and 13, the NCP 12–16 and the Trinamool between 12 and 16. The poll showed the BJP-led Front getting between 183 and 195 seats. It includes the BJP (140–146), the JD (U) 17–21. In the end, in 2009 Indian general election, UPA got 262 (Congress – 206) and NDA 159 (BJP – 116).

== 2004 Indian general elections ==
The CVoter exit poll projections for Star News predicted NDA getting between 267–279 and Congress+Allies between 169 and 181. In the end, in 2004 Indian general election, Congress+Allies (UPA) got 218 (Congress 145) and NDA got 181 (BJP – 138).

== Controversy ==
CVoter allegedly carried out tracking polls for Indian news networks Times Now, India Today & India TV. A television news channel claimed in a sting operation conducted by it that some of the agencies which conduct opinion polls before elections are willing to tweak their findings for money. It included global giants like Ipsos and CVoter. After the expose, India Today Group suspended its CVoter contract.
