= News Nation Assam =

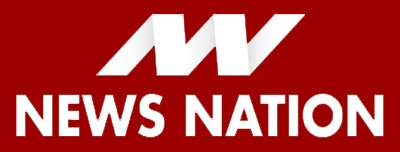
- Country: India
- Broadcast area: India and worldwide
- Headquarters: Guwahati, Assam, India

Programming
- Language: Assamese
- Picture format: 1080i HDTV (downscaled to 16:9 576i for the SDTV feed)

Ownership
- Owner: Time media, Rockteem Bhattacharjee
- Key people: Rockteem bhattacharjee
- Sister channels: Travelxp

History
- Launched: October 2016

Links
- Website: www.newsnation.in

News Nation Assam (formerly called NNA) carries news on issues in fields like politics, crime, corruption, cricket, and Bollywood.

== See also ==
- List of television stations in India
