= Dakshin Durgapur railway station =

Railway station in West Bengal, India

Dakshin Durgapur
- Dakshin Durgapur Railway Station

General information
- Location: Gazipur, Dakshin Durgapur, South 24 Parganas, West Bengal; India
- Coordinates: 22.325683°N 88.406184°E
- Elevation: 9 metres (30 ft)
- System: Kolkata Suburban Railway Station
- Owner: Indian Railways
- Operator: Eastern Railway
- Line: Diamond Harbour Branch line
- Platforms: 2
- Tracks: 2

Construction
- Structure type: Standard (on-ground station)
- Parking: Not Available
- Cycle facilities: Not Available
- Accessible: Not Available

Other information
- Status: Functioning
- Station code: DKDP
- Zone(s): Eastern Railway
- Division(s): Sealdah

History
- Opened: 1883; 143 years ago
- Electrified: 1965–66
- Former names: Eastern Bengal Railway
Services
Preceding station	Kolkata Suburban Railway	Following station
Hotar towards Diamond Harbour	Sealdah South Diamond Harbour Branch line	Kalyanpur towards Sealdah
Route map
Location

Dakshin Durgapur railway station is a Kolkata Suburban Railway Station on the Diamond Harbour Branch line. It is under the jurisdiction of the Sealdah railway division in the Eastern Railway zone of the Indian Railways. Dakshin Durgapur railway station is situated at Gazipur, Dakshin Durgapur, South 24 Parganas district in the Indian state of West Bengal.

== History ==
In 1883, the Eastern Bengal Railway constructed a 1,676 mm (5 ft 6 in)-wide broad-gauge railway from Baruipur Junction to Diamond Harbour via Dakshin Durgapur.

== Electrification ==
Electrification from Baruipur Junction to Diamond Harbour including Dakshin Durgapur was completed with 25 kV AC overhead system in 1965–66.

== Station complex ==
The platform is very much well sheltered. The station possesses many facilities including water and sanitation. There is a proper approach road to this station.
