= Dhakuria railway station =

Railway station in Kolkata, India

Dhakuria
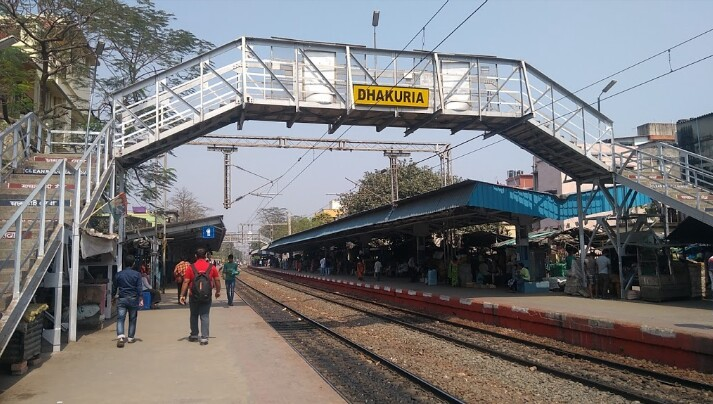
- Dhakuria railway station

General information
- Location: Dhakuria, Kolkata, West Bengal 700031; India
- Coordinates: 22.5094085°N 88.371185°E
- Elevation: 9 metres (30 ft)
- System: Kolkata Suburban Railway Station
- Owner: Indian Railways
- Operator: Eastern Railway
- Line: Main line
- Platforms: 2
- Tracks: 2

Construction
- Structure type: Standard (on-ground station)
- Parking: Not available
- Cycle facilities: Not available
- Accessible: Not available

Other information
- Status: Functioning
- Station code: DHK
- Zone(s): Eastern Railway
- Division(s): Sealdah

History
- Opened: 1862; 164 years ago
- Electrified: 1965–66
- Former names: Eastern Bengal Railway
Services
Preceding station	Kolkata Suburban Railway	Following station
Jadavpur towards Sonarpur Junction	Sealdah South Main line	Ballygunge Junction towards Sealdah
Route map
Location

Dhakuria railway station is a Kolkata Suburban Railway station on the main line. It is under the jurisdiction of the Sealdah railway division in the Eastern Railway zone of the Indian Railways. It serves the local area of Dhakuria in Kolkata in the Indian state of West Bengal.

== History ==
In 1862, the Eastern Bengal Railway constructed a 1,676 mm (5 ft 6 in)-wide broad-gauge railway from Sealdah to Sonarpur Junction via Dhakuria.

== Electrification ==
Electrification from Sealdah to Sonarpur Junction including Dhakuria was completed with 25 kV AC overhead system in 1965–66.

== Station complex ==
The platform is well sheltered. The station possesses many facilities including water and sanitation. It is well connected to the SH-1. There is a proper approach road to this station.
