= Gurudas Nagar railway station =

Railway station in West Bengal, India

Gurudas Nagar
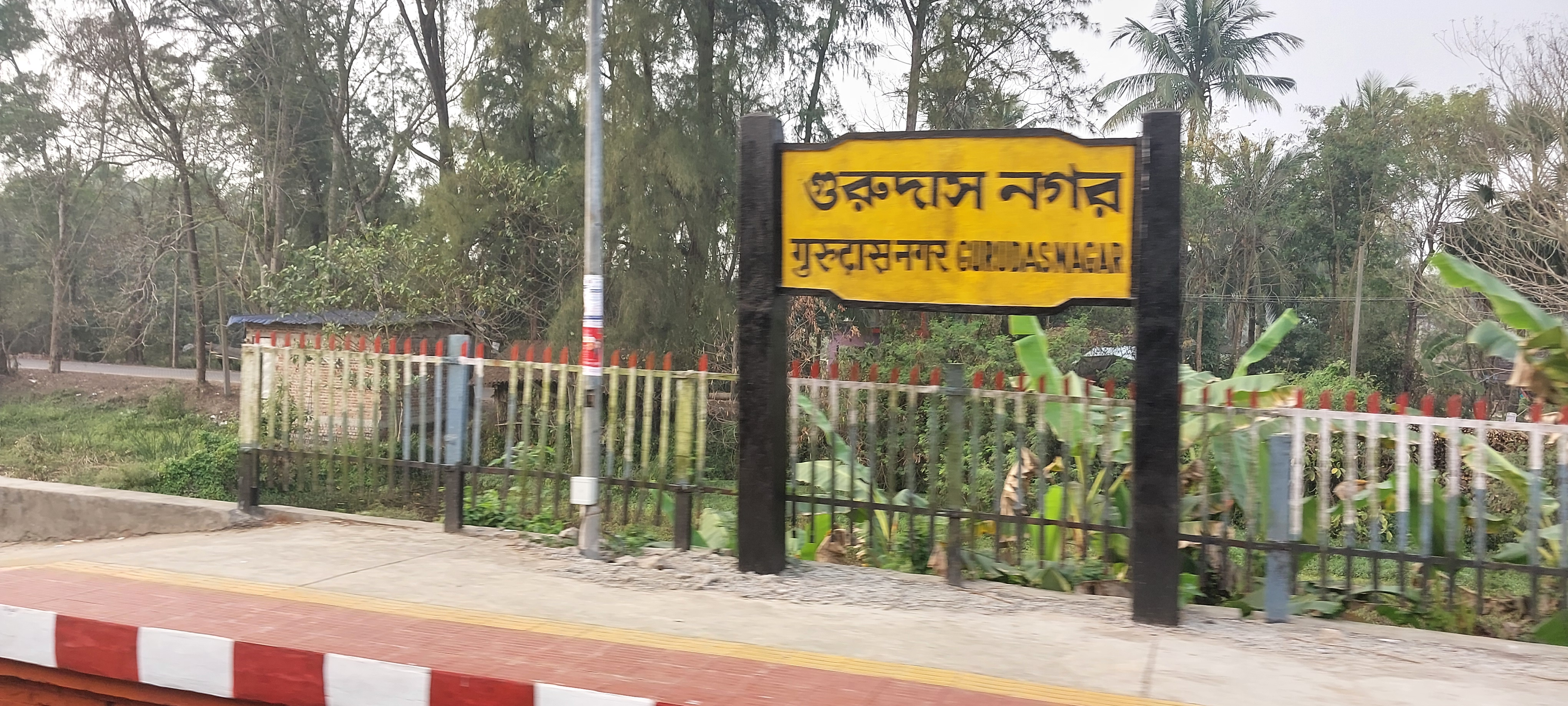
- Gurudas Nagar railway station

General information
- Location: Diamond Harbour Road, Lalbati, Gurudas Nagar, South 24 Parganas, West Bengal; India
- Coordinates: 22.199664°N 88.215957°E
- Elevation: 8 metres (26 ft)
- System: Kolkata Suburban Railway Station
- Owner: Indian Railways
- Operator: Eastern Railway
- Line: Diamond Harbour Branch line
- Platforms: 2
- Tracks: 2

Construction
- Structure type: Standard (on-ground station)
- Parking: Not available
- Cycle facilities: Not available
- Accessible: Not available

Other information
- Status: Functioning
- Station code: GURN
- Zone(s): Eastern Railway
- Division(s): Sealdah

History
- Opened: 1883; 143 years ago
- Electrified: 1965–66
- Former names: Eastern Bengal Railway
Services
Preceding station	Kolkata Suburban Railway	Following station
Diamond Harbour Terminus	Sealdah South Diamond Harbour Branch line	Basuldanga towards Sealdah
Route map
Location

Gurudas Nagar railway station is a Kolkata Suburban Railway Station on the Diamond Harbour Branch line. It is under the jurisdiction of the Sealdah railway division in the Eastern Railway zone of the Indian Railways. Gurudas Nagar railway station is situated beside Diamond Harbour Road, Durganagar, Lalbati, Gurudas Nagar, South 24 Parganas district in the Indian state of West Bengal.

== History ==
In 1883, the Eastern Bengal Railway constructed a 1,676 mm (5 ft 6 in)-wide broad-gauge railway from Baruipur Junction to Diamond Harbour via Gurudas Nagar.

== Electrification ==
Electrification from Baruipur Junction to Diamond Harbour including Gurudas Nagar was completed with 25 kV AC overhead system in 1965–66.

== Station complex ==
The platform is well sheltered. The station possesses many facilities including water and sanitation. There is a proper approach road to this station.
