= List of Kolkata Suburban Railway stations =

This is a list of stations of the Kolkata Suburban Railway, a suburban rail system serving the Kolkata Metropolitan Region in West Bengal, India.

The Kolkata Suburban Railway was opened in 1854. The system is operated by Eastern Railway and South Eastern Railway zone. Each route contains "slow" and "fast" tracks. "Slow" tracks are dedicated tracks for suburban trains, while "fast" tracks are shared with long-distance trains operated by Indian Railways. Some railway stations on the network serve both suburban as well as long-distance trains.

The Kolkata Suburban Railway comprises five major lines – Eastern line, South Eastern line, Circular line, South lines and Chord link line. Each of these corridors may consist of additional lines that may intersect with each other. The system uses rolling stock of broad gauge and consists of largely at-grade and short segments of elevated and embankment lines. The railway system is open from about 0400 to 0100 and has an average daily ridership of 2-3 million commuters. It is the biggest suburban rail network in India, with a record of 400+ stations and a total of 1,501 km (933 mi); it is the world's 7th longest suburban railway network.

== Stations ==
Terminal station
Transfer station (excluding transfer to Indian Railways)
Terminal and transfer station to other lines
Defunct

Station name		Station code	Line	Year opened	Connection	Fast train stop (Note: Fast train stop indicates that fast services on the Kolkata Suburban Railway halt at this station. All Circular railway Line services are slow services.)	Long distance (Note: Long distance indicates that trains other than local trains halt at this station. These trains are usually part of the Indian Railways network.)	Notes	Ref.
English	Bengali	Station code	Line	Year opened	Connection	Fast train stop	Long distance	Notes	Ref.
Abada	আবাদা		South Eastern Line			–	–		
Adisaptagram	আদিসপ্তগ্রাম		Eastern Line			–	–		
Agarpara	আগরপাড়া		Eastern Line			–	–		
Agradwip	অগ্রদ্বীপ		Eastern Line			check	–		
Akaipur	আকাইপুর		Eastern Line			–	–		
Akra	আকড়া		South Lines			–	–		
Amarun	আমারুন		Eastern Line			–	–		
Ambika Kalna	অম্বিকা কালনা	ABKA	Eastern Line			check	–		
Amta	আমতা	AMZ	South Eastern Line			–	–		
Andul	আন্দুল		South Eastern Line; Chord link Line			–	–		
Arambagh PC Sen	আরামবাগ পিসি সেন	AMBG	Eastern Line			–	–		
Aranghata	আড়ংঘাটা		Eastern Line			–	–		
Ashapurna Devi	আশাপূর্ণা দেবী		South Eastern Line			–	–		
Ashoknagar Road	অশোকনগর রোড	ASKR	Eastern Line			–	–		
B.B.D. Bag	বি.বি.ডি. ব্যাগ		Circular Line			–	–		
Badalpur	বাদলপুর		South Eastern Line			–	–		
Badkulla	বাদকুল্লা		Eastern Line			–	–		
Bagbazar	বাগবাজার		Circular Line			–	–		
Baghajatin	বাঘাযতীন		South Lines			–	–		
Baghnapara	বাঘনাপাড়া		Eastern Line			check	–		
Bagila	বাগিলা		Eastern Line			–	–		
Bagnan	বাগনান		South Eastern Line			check	–		
Bagula	বগুলা		Eastern Line			–	–		
Bahadurpur	বাহাদুরপুর		Eastern Line			–	–		
Baharu	বহরু		South Lines			–	–		
Bahira Kalibari	বহিরা কালীবাড়ি		Eastern Line			–	–		
Bahirgachhi Halt	বহিরগাছি হল্ট		Eastern Line			–	–		
Bahirkhanda	বাহিরখন্ড		Eastern Line			–	–		
Bahirpuya Halt	বাহিরপুয়া হল্ট		South Lines			–	–		
Baidyabati	বৈদ্যবাটি		Eastern Line			–	–		
Bainchi	বৈঁচি		Eastern Line			–	–		
Bainchigram	বৈঁচিগ্রাম		Eastern Line			–	–		
Balagarh	বলাগড়		Eastern Line			check	–		
Balarambati	বলরামবাটি		Eastern Line			–	–		
Balgona	বলগনা	BGNA	Eastern Line			–	–		
Balichak	বালিচক		South Eastern Line			check	–		
Bally	বালি		Eastern Line			check	–		
Bally Ghat	বালিঘাট		Chord link Line			–	–		
Bally Halt	বালিহল্ট		Chord link Line			–	–		
Ballygunge Junction	বালিগঞ্জ জংশন	BLN	South Lines; Circular Line			–	–		
Baltikuri	বাল্টিকুরি		Chord link Line; South Eastern Line			–	–		
Bamangachhi	বামনগাছি		Eastern Line			–	–		
Bandar	বন্দর		South Eastern Line			–	–		
Bandel Junction	ব্যাণ্ডেল জংশন	BDC	Eastern Line			check	check		
Bangaon Junction	বনগাঁও জংশন	BNJ	Eastern Line			–	–		
Bankapasi	বাঁকপাশি		Eastern Line			–	–		
Bankimnagar	বঙ্কিমনগর		Eastern Line			–	–		
Bankra Nayabaz	বাঁকড়া নয়াবাজ		South Eastern Line; Chord link Line			–	–		
Banpur	বানপুর		Eastern Line			–	–		
Bans Beria	বান্স বেরিয়া		Eastern Line			check	–		
Baranagar Road	বরাহনগর রোড		Chord link Line			–	–		
Barasat Junction	বারাসাত জংশন	BT	Eastern Line			–	–		
Barda	বরদা		South Eastern Line			–	–		
Barddhaman Junction	বর্ধমান জংশন	BWN	Eastern Line			check	check		
Bargachia	বড়গাছিয়া		South Eastern Line			–	–		
Barrackpore	ব্যারাকপুর	BP	Eastern Line			check	check		
Barrackpore Racecourse	ব্যারাকপুর রেসকোর্স		Eastern Line			–	–		
Baruipara	বারুইপাড়া	BRPA	Eastern Line			–	–		
Baruipur Junction	বারুইপুর জংশন	BRP	South Lines			–	–		
Basirhat	বসিরহাট	BSHT	Eastern Line			check	check		
Basuldanga	বাসুলডাঙ্গা		South Lines			–	–		
Basulya Sutahata	বাসুলিয়া সুতাহাটা		South Eastern Line			–	–		
Bathna Krittibas	বাথনা কৃত্তিবাস		Eastern Line			–	–		
Bauria	বাউরিয়া		South Eastern Line			–	–		
Begampur	বেগমপুর		Eastern Line			–	–		
Behula	বেহুলা		Eastern Line			check	–		
Belanagar	বেলানগর		Eastern Line			–	–		
Beldanga	বেলডাঙা		Eastern Line			–	–		
Belerhat	বেলেরহাট		Eastern Line			check	–		
Belgharia	বেলঘরিয়া		Eastern Line			–	–		
Beliaghata Road	বেলিয়াঘাটা রোড		Eastern Line			–	–		
Belmuri	বেলমুড়ি		Eastern Line			–	–		
Belur	বেলুড়		Eastern Line			–	–		
Belur Math	বেলুড় মঠ		Eastern Line			–	–		
Berhampore Court	বহরমপুর কোর্ট		Eastern Line			–	–		
Betberia Ghola	বেতবাড়িয়া ঘোলা		South Lines			–	–		
Bethuadahari	বেথুয়াডহরী		Eastern Line			–	–		
Bhabta	ভবতা		Eastern Line			–	–		
Bhadreshwar	ভদ্রেশ্বর		Eastern Line			–	–		
Bhagwangola	ভগবানগোলা		Eastern Line			–	–		
Bhandartikuri	ভান্ডারটিকুরী		Eastern Line			check	–		
Bhasila	ভাসিলা		Eastern Line			–	–		
Bhatar	ভাতার		Eastern Line			–	–		
Bhattanagar	ভট্টনগর		Chord link Line			–	–		
Bhayna	ভায়না		Eastern Line			–	–		
Bhogpur	ভোগপুর		South Eastern Line			check	–		
Bhyabla Halt	ভ্যাবলা হল্ট		Eastern Line			–	–		
Bibhuti Bhushan Halt	বিভূতি ভূষণ হল্ট		Eastern Line			–	–		
Bidhannagar Road	বিধাননগর রোড		Eastern Line; Chord link Line			–	–		
Bidyadharpur	বিদ্যাধরপুর		South Lines			–	–		
Biman Bandar	বিমানবন্দর		Eastern Line			–	–	Transferred to Yellow Line and Orange Line	
Bir Shibpur	বীর শিবপুর		South Eastern Line			–	–		
Bira	বিরা	BIRA	Eastern Line			–	–		
Birati	বিরাটি		Eastern Line			–	–		
Birnagar	বীরনগর		Eastern Line			–	–		
Bisharpara Kodaliya	বিশরপাড়া কোদালিয়া		Eastern Line			–	–		
Bishnupriya	বিষ্ণুপ্রিয়া		Eastern Line			check	–		
Brace Bridge	ব্রেসব্রিজ		South Lines			–	–		
Burra Bazar	বড়বাজার		Circular Line			–	–		
Canning	ক্যানিং	CG	South Lines			–	–		
Chakdaha	চাকদহ		Eastern Line			–	–		
Chamardighi	চামারদিঘী		Eastern Line			–	–		
Champahati	চম্পাহাটী		South Lines			–	–		
Champapukur	চম্পাপুকুর		Eastern Line			–	–		
Chanchai	চাঁচাই		Eastern Line			–	–		
Chandannagar	চন্দননগর		Eastern Line			–	–		
Chandanpur	চন্দনপুর	CDAE	Eastern Line			–	–		
Chandpara	চাঁদপাড়া	CDP	Eastern Line			–	–		
Chengel	চেঙ্গাইল		South Eastern Line			–	–		
Cheragram	চেরাগ্রাম		Eastern Line			–	–		
Chuchura	চুঁচুড়া		Eastern Line			–	–		
Coopers Halt	কুপার্স হল্ট		Eastern Line			–	–		
Cossimbazar	কাশিমবাজার		Eastern Line			–	–		
Cossye Halt	কোসিয়ে হাল্ট		South Eastern Line			–	–		
Dainhat	দাঁইহাট		Eastern Line			check	–		
Dakshin Barasat	দক্ষিণ বারাসাত		South Lines			–	–		
Dakshin Durgapur	দক্ষিণ দুর্গাপুর		South Lines			–	–		
Dakshinbari	দক্ষিণবাড়ি		South Eastern Line			–	–		
Dakshineswar	দক্ষিণেশ্বর		Chord link Line			–	check		
Dankuni Junction	ডানকুনি জংশন		Eastern Line; Chord link Line			–	–		
Dansi	ডাঁসী		South Eastern Line			–	–		
Dasnagar	দাশনগর	DSNR	South Eastern Line			–	–		
Debagram	দেবগ্রাম		Eastern Line			–	–		
Debipur	দেবীপুর		Eastern Line			–	–		
Deshapran	দেশপ্রাণ		South Eastern Line			–	–		
Deula	দেউলা		South Lines			–	–		
Deulti	দেউলটি		South Eastern Line			check	–		
Dhakuria	ঢাকুরিয়া		South Lines			–	–		
Dhamua	ধামুয়া		South Lines			–	–		
Dhaniakhali	ধনিয়াখালি হল্ট		Eastern Line			–	–		
Dhapdhapi	ধপধপি		South Lines			–	–		
Dhatrigram	ধাত্রীগ্রাম		Eastern Line			check	–		
Dhubulia	ধুবুলিয়া		Eastern Line			–	–		
Diamond Harbour	ডায়মন্ড হারবার	DH	South Lines			–	–		
Diara	দিয়াড়া		Eastern Line			–	–		
Digha	দীঘা	DGHA	South Eastern Line			check	check		
Dignagar	দিগনগর		Eastern Line			–	–		
Domjur	ডোমজুর		South Eastern Line			–	–		
Domjur Road	ডোমজুর রোড		South Eastern Line			–	–		
Duan	ডুঁয়া		South Eastern Line			check	–		
Dum Dum Cantonment	দমদম ক্যান্টনমেন্ট	DDC	Eastern Line			–	–		
Dum Dum Junction	দমদম জংশন	DDJ	Eastern Line; Circular Line; Chord link Line			–	–	Terminus for Circular Line	
Dumurdaha	ডুমুরদহ		Eastern Line			check	–		
Durgachak	দুর্গাচক		South Eastern Line			–	–		
Durgachak Town	দুর্গাচক টাউন		South Eastern Line			–	–		
Durganagar	দুর্গানগর		Eastern Line			–	–		
Duttapukur	দত্তপুকুর	DTK	Eastern Line			–	–		
Eden Gardens	ইডেন গার্ডেনস		Circular Line			–	–		
Gangnapur	গাংনাপুর		Eastern Line			–	–		
Gangpur	গঙ্গাপুর		Eastern Line			–	–		
Garia	গড়িয়া		South Lines			–	–		
Garifa	গরিফা		Eastern Line			–	–		
Gede	গেদে	GEDE	Eastern Line			–	–	Situated on Bangladesh–India border	
Ghora Ras Ghona	ঘোড়া রস ঘোনা		Eastern Line			–	–		
Ghoraghata	ঘোড়াঘাটা		South Eastern Line			–	–		
Ghutiari Sharif	ঘুটিয়ারী শরীফ		South Lines			–	–		
Girimaidan	গিরি ময়দান		South Eastern Line			check	–		
Gobardanga	গোবরডাঙা	GBG	Eastern Line			–	–		
Gobra	গোবরা		Eastern Line			–	–		
Gocharan	গোচারণ		South Lines			–	–		
Goghat	গোঘাট		Eastern Line			–	–		
Gokulpur	গোকুলপুর		South Eastern Line			check	–		
Gopalnagar	গোপালনগর		Eastern Line			–	–		
Gourdaha Halt	গৌড়দহ হল্ট		South Lines			–	–		
Guma	গুমা	GUMA	Eastern Line			–	–		
Guptipara	গুপ্তিপাড়া		Eastern Line			check	–		
Gurap	গুড়াপ		Eastern Line			–	–		
Gurudas Nagar	গুরুদাস নগর		South Lines			–	–		
Habibpur	হবিবপুর		Eastern Line			–	–		
Habra	হাবড়া	HB	Eastern Line			–	–		
Hajigarh	হাজিগড়		Eastern Line			–	–		
Haldia	হলদিয়া	HLZ	South Eastern Line			–	–		
Halisahar	হালিশহর		Eastern Line			–	–		
Haripal	হরিপাল	HPL	Eastern Line			–	–		
Harish Nagar Halt	হরিশ নগর হল্ট		Eastern Line			–	–		
Harishdadpur	হরিশদাদপুর		South Eastern Line			–	–		
Harua Road	হাড়োয়া রোড		Eastern Line			–	–		
Hasnabad	হাসনাবাদ	HNB	Eastern Line			–	–		
Haur	হাউর		South Eastern Line			check	–		
Henria	হেঁড়িয়া		South Eastern Line			–	–		
Hindmotor flag	হিন্ডমোটর ফ্ল্যাগ		Eastern Line			–	–		
Hogla	হোগলা		South Lines			–	–		
Hooghly	হুগলী		Eastern Line			–	–		
Hooghly Ghat	হুগলী ঘাট		Eastern Line			–	–		
Hotar	হোটর		South Lines			–	–		
Howrah	হাওড়া	HWH	South Eastern Line; Eastern Line			check	check		
Hridaypur	হৃদয়পুর		Eastern Line			–	–		
Ichhapur	ইছাপুর		Eastern Line			–	–		
Islampara Halt	ইসলামপাড়া হল্ট		Eastern Line			–	–		
Jadavpur	যাদবপুর		South Lines			–	–		
Jagaddal	জগদ্দল		Eastern Line			–	–		
Jakpur	জকপুর		South Eastern Line			check	–		
Jalal Khali Halt	জালাল খালি হল্ট		Eastern Line			–	–		
Jalalsi	জালালসি		South Eastern Line			–	–		
Janai Road	জনাই রোড		Eastern Line			–	–		
Jaugram	জৌগ্রাম		Eastern Line			–	–		
Jaynagar Majilpur	জয়নগর মজিলপুর	JNM	South Lines			–	–		
Jessore Road	যশোর রোড		Eastern Line			–	–	Transferred to Yellow Line	
Jhaluarbar	ঝালুয়ারবার		South Eastern Line			–	–		
Jhapandanga	ঝাপানডাঙ্গা		Eastern Line			–	–		
Jiaganj	জিয়াগঞ্জ		Eastern Line			–	–		
Jirat	জিরাট		Eastern Line			check	–		
Kaichar	কাইচর		Eastern Line			–	–		
Kaikala	কৈকালা		Eastern Line			–	–		
Kakdwip	কাকদ্বীপ	KWDP	South Lines			–	–		
Kalikapur	কালিকাপুর		South Lines			–	–		
Kalinagar	কালিনগর		Eastern Line			–	–		
Kalinarayanpur Junction	কালিনারায়ানপুর জংশন		Eastern Line			–	–		
Kalyani	কল্যানী	KYI	Eastern Line			–	–		
Kalyani Ghoshpara	কল্যানী ঘোষপাড়া	KLYG	Eastern Line			–	–		
Kalyani Silpanchal	কল্যানী শিল্পাঞ্চল	KLYS	Eastern Line			–	–		
Kalyani Simanta	কল্যাণী সীমান্ত	KLYM	Eastern Line			–	–		
Kalyanpur	কল্যানপুর		South Lines			–	–		
Kamarkundu	কামারকুণ্ডু	KQLS; KQU	Eastern Line			–	–		
Kamnara	কামনারা		Eastern Line			–	–		
Kanchrapara	কাঁচড়াপাড়া		Eastern Line			–	–		
Kanchrapara Workshop Gate	কাঁচড়াপাড়া কারখানা গেট		Eastern Line			–	–		
Kankinara	কাঁকিনাড়া		Eastern Line			–	–		
Kankra Mirzanagar	কাঁকড়া মির্জানগর		Eastern Line			–	–		
Kanthi	কাঁথি		South Eastern Line			–	–		
Karanjali	করঞ্জলী		South Lines			–	–		
Karea Kadambagachhi	করিয়া কদম্বগাছী		Eastern Line			–	–		
Karjana	কর্জনা		Eastern Line			–	–		
Karjanagram	কর্জনাগ্রাম		Eastern Line			–	–		
Kashinagar	কাশিনগর		South Lines			–	–		
Katwa Junction	কাটোয়া জংশন	KWAE	Eastern Line			check	check		
Kazipara	কাজিপাড়া		Eastern Line			–	–		
Keshabpur	কেশবপুর		South Eastern Line			–	–		
Khamargachi	খামারগাছি		Eastern Line			check	–		
Khanyan	খান্যান		Eastern Line			–	–		
Kharagpur Junction	খড়গপুর জংশন	KGP	South Eastern Line			check	check		
Khardaha	খড়দহ		Eastern Line			–	–		
Khiddirpur	খিদিরপুর		Circular Line			–	–		
Khirai	ক্ষীরাই		South Eastern Line			check	–		
Kolaghat	কোলাঘাট		South Eastern Line			–	–		
Kolkata	কলকাতা	KOAA	Circular Line; Eastern Line			–	check		
Komagata Maru Budge Budge	কোমাগাতা মারু বাজ বাজ	KBGB	South Lines			–	–		
Kona	কোনা		South Eastern Line			–	–		
Konnagar	কোন্নগর		Eastern Line			–	–		
Krishna Mohan	কৃষ্ণ মোহন		South Lines			–	–		
Krishnanagar City Junction	কৃষ্ণনগর সিটি জংশন	KNJ	Eastern Line			–	check		
Krishnapur	কৃষ্ণপুর		Eastern Line			–	–		
Kshetia	ক্ষেতিয়া		Eastern Line			–	–		
Kulgachia	কুলগাছিয়া		South Eastern Line			–	–		
Kulpi	কুলপি		South Lines			–	–		
Kuntighat	কুন্তিঘাট		Eastern Line			check	–		
Lake Gardens	লেক গার্ডেনস		Circular Line; South Lines			–	–		
Lakshmikantapur	লক্ষ্মীকান্তপুর	LKPR	South Lines			–	–		
Lakshmipur	লক্ষ্মীপুর		Eastern Line			check	–		
Lalgola	লালগোলা		Eastern Line			check	check		
Lavan Satyagrah Smarak	লবণ সত্যাগ্রহ স্মারক		South Eastern Line			–	–		
Lebutala	লেবুতলা		Eastern Line			–	–		
Liluah	লিলুয়া		Eastern Line			–	–		
Loknath	লোকনাথ		Eastern Line			–	–		
Machhalandapur	মছলন্দপুর	MSL	Eastern Line			–	–		
Madanpur	মদনপুর		Eastern Line			–	–		
Madhabnagar	মাধবনগর		South Lines			–	–		
Madhabpur	মাধবপুর		South Lines			–	–		
Madhusudanpur	মধুসুদনপুর		Eastern Line			–	–		
Madhyamgram	মধ্যমগ্রাম	MMG	Eastern Line			–	–		
Madhyampur	মধ্যমপুর		Eastern Line			–	–		
Madpur	মাদপুর		South Eastern Line			–	–		
Magra Hat	মগরাহাট		South Lines			–	–		
Mahendralalnagar	মহেন্দ্রলাল নগর		South Eastern Line			–	–		
Mahishadal	মহিষাদল		South Eastern Line			–	–		
Majerhat	মাঝেরহাট	MJT	Circular Line; South Lines			–	–		
Majhdia	মাঝদিয়া		Eastern Line			–	–		
Majhergram	মাঝেরগ্রাম		Eastern Line			–	–		
Maju	মাজু		South Eastern Line			–	–		
Makardaha	মাকড়দহ		Eastern Line			–	–		
Malatipur	মালতিপুর		Eastern Line			–	–		
Maliya	মালিয়া		Eastern Line			–	–		
Mallikpur	মালিকপুর		South Lines			–	–		
Mankundu	মানকুণ্ডু		Eastern Line			–	–		
Masagram	মসাগ্রাম	MSAE	Eastern Line			–	–		
Matania Anantapur	মাতানিয়া অনন্তপুর		Eastern Line			–	–		
Mathurapur Road	মথুরাপুর রোড		South Lines			–	–		
Matla Halt	মাতলা হল্ট		South Lines			–	–		
Mayapur	মায়াপুর		Eastern Line			–	–		
Mayurhat	মযুরহাট		Eastern Line			–	–		
Mecheda	মেচেদা	MCA	South Eastern Line			check	check		
Memari	মেমারী	MYM	Eastern Line			–	–		
Mertala Phaleya	মের্তালা ফালেয়া		Eastern Line			check	–		
Midnapore	মেদিনীপুর	MDN	South Eastern Line			check	check		
Mirzapur-Bankipur	মির্জাপুর-বাঁকিপুর		Eastern Line			–	–		
Mogra	মগরা		Eastern Line			–	–		
Mourigram	মৌরিগ্রাম		South Eastern Line			–	–		
Munsirhat	মুন্সিরহাট		South Eastern Line			–	–		
Muragacha	মুরগাছা		Eastern Line			–	–		
Murshidabad Junction	মুর্শিদাবাদ জংশন		Eastern Line			–	–		
Naba Raynagar	নব রায়নগর		Eastern Line			–	–		
Nabadwip Dham	নবদ্বীপ ধাম	NDAE	Eastern Line			check	check		
Nabagram	নবগ্রাম		Eastern Line			–	–		
Nachinda	নাচিন্দা		South Eastern Line			–	–		
Naihati Junction	নৈহাটি জংশন	NH	Eastern Line			check	check		
Nalikul	নালিকুল		Eastern Line			–	–		
Nalpur	নলপুর		South Eastern Line			–	–		
Namkhana	নামখানা	NMKA	South Lines			–	–		
Nandaigajan	নন্দাইগাজান		South Eastern Line			–	–		
Nandaigram Halt	নন্দীগ্রাম হল্ট		Eastern Line			–	–		
Nandakumar	নন্দকুমার		South Eastern Line			–	–		
Nangi	নুঙ্গী		South Lines			–	–		
Narayan Pakuria Murail	নারায়ন পাকুরিয়া মুরাইল		South Eastern Line			–	–		
Narendrapur	নরেন্দ্রপুর		South Lines			–	–		
Nashipur Road	নাশিপুর রোড		Eastern Line			–	–		
Nasibpur	নসিবপুর		Eastern Line			–	–		
Netra	নেতড়া		South Lines			–	–		
New Alipore	নিউ আলিপুর		Circular Line; South Lines			–	–		
New Balarampur Halt	নিউ বলরামপুর হল্ট		Eastern Line			–	–		
New Barrackpur	নিউ ব্যারাকপুর		Eastern Line			–	–		
New Garia	নিউ গড়িয়া	NGRI	South Lines			–	–		
Nigan	নিগান		Eastern Line			–	–		
Nimdanri	নিমদাঁড়ি		Eastern Line			–	–		
Nimo	নিমো		Eastern Line			–	–		
Nischintapur	নিশ্চিন্দপুর		South Lines			–	–		
Nischintapur Market	নিশ্চিন্দপুর মার্কেট		South Lines			–	–		
Padmapukur	পদ্মপুকুর		South Eastern Line			–	–		
Pagla Chandi	পাগলা চণ্ডী		Eastern Line			–	–		
Palla Road	পাল্লা রোড		Eastern Line			–	–		
Palpara	পালপাড়া		Eastern Line			–	–		
Palsit	পালসিট		Eastern Line			–	–		
Palta	পলতা		Eastern Line			–	–		
Pancheberia	পাঁচবেরিয়া		Eastern Line			–	–		
Panskura Junction	পাঁশকুড়া জংশন	PKU	South Eastern Line			check	check		
Pantihal	পান্তিহাল		South Eastern Line			–	–		
Park Circus	পার্ক সার্কাস		South Lines; Circular line			–	–		
Patipukur	পাতিপুকুর		Circular Line			–	–		
Patuli	পাটুলি		Eastern Line			check	–		
Payradanga	পায়রাডাঙ্গা		Eastern Line			–	–		
Petrapole	পেট্রাপোল		Eastern Line			–	–		
Phuleswar	ফুলেশ্বর		South Eastern Line			–	–		
Phulia	ফুলিয়া		Eastern Line			–	–		
Piali	পিয়ালী		South Lines			–	–		
Pirtala	পীর্তলা		Eastern Line			–	–		
Plassey	পলাশী		Eastern Line			–	–		
Porabazar	পরাবাজার		Eastern Line			–	–		
Prinsep Ghat	প্রিন্সেপ ঘাট		Circular Line			–	–		
Pundooah	পাণ্ডুয়া	PDA	Eastern Line			–	–		
Purbasthali	পূর্বস্থলী		Eastern Line			check	–		
Radhamohanpur	রাধামোহনপুর		South Eastern Line			check	–		
Raghunathbari	রঘুনাথবাড়ী		South Eastern Line			–	–		
Rajchandrapur	রাজচন্দ্রপুর		Chord link Line			–	–		
Rajgoda	রাজগোদা		South Eastern Line			–	–		
Ramnagar	রামনগর		South Eastern Line			–	–		
Ramrajatala	রামরাজাতলা		South Eastern Line			–	–		
Ranaghat Junction	রানাঘাট জংশন	RHA	Eastern Line			–	check		
Rasulpur	রসুলপুর		Eastern Line			–	–		
Rejinagar	রেজিনগর		Eastern Line			–	–		
Remount Road	রিমাউন্ট রোড		Circular Line			–	–		
Rishra	রিষড়া		Eastern Line			–	–		
Sahebtala	সাহেবতলা		Eastern Line			check	–		
Sahid Matangini	শহীদ মাতঙ্গিনী		South Eastern Line			–	–		
Saktigarh	শক্তিগড়		Eastern Line			–	–		
Samudragarh	সমুদ্রগড়		Eastern Line			check	–		
Sangrampur	সংগ্ৰামপুর		South Lines			–	–		
Sanhati Halt	সংহতি হল্ট	SNHT	Eastern Line			–	–		
Sankrail	সাঁকরাইল		South Eastern Line			–	–		
Santoshpur	সন্তোষপুর		South Lines			–	–		
Santragachi Junction	সাঁতরাগাছি জংশন	SRC	South Eastern Line			check	check		
Saota	সাওটা		Eastern Line			–	–		
Sargachi	সরগাছি		Eastern Line			–	–		
Satberia	সাতবেড়িয়া		Eastern Line			–	–		
Satish Samanta Halt	সতীশ সামন্ত হল্ট		South Eastern Line			–	–		
Sealdah	শিয়ালদহ	SDAH	Eastern Line; South Lines; Chord link Line			–	check		
Seoraphuli Junction	শেওড়াফুলি জংশন	SHE	Eastern Line			check	check		
Shalimar	শালিমার	SHM	South Eastern Line			–	check		
Shantinagar Halt	শান্তিনগর হাল্ট		Eastern Line			–	–		
Shantipur Junction	শান্তিপুর জংশন	STB	Eastern Line			–	–		
Shasan Road	শাসন রোড		South Lines			–	–		
Shrirampur	শ্রীরামপুর	SRP	Eastern Line			check	check		
Shyam Chak	শ্যামচক		South Eastern Line			check	–		
Shyamnagar	শ্যামনগর		Eastern Line			–	–		
Sibaichandi	শিবাইচন্ডী		Eastern Line			–	–		
Silpaprabesh	শিল্পপ্রবেশ		South Eastern Line			–	–		
Simlagarh	সিমলাগড়		Eastern Line			–	–		
Simurali	সিমুরালি		Eastern Line			–	–		
Singur	সিঙ্গুর		Eastern Line			–	–		
Sir Gurudas Banerjee Halt	স্যার গুরুদাস ব্যানার্জী হল্ট		Circular Line			–	–		
Siraj Nagar Halt	সিরাজনগর হল্ট		Eastern Line			–	–		
Sitalpur	শীতলপুর		South Eastern Line			–	–		
Sodpur	সোদপুর		Eastern Line			–	–		
Somra Bazar	সোম্রা বাজার		Eastern Line			check	–		
Sonadanga	সোনাডাঙ্গা		Eastern Line			–	–		
Sonarpur Junction	সোনারপুর জংশন	SPR	South Lines			–	–		
Sondalia	সোন্দালিয়া		Eastern Line			–	–		
Sovabazar Ahiritola	শোভাবাজার আহিরিটোলা		Circular Line			–	–		
Srikhanda	শ্রীখণ্ড		Eastern Line			–	–		
Sripat Srikhanda	শ্রীপাট শ্রীখণ্ড		Eastern Line			–	–		
Subarnamrigi	সুবর্ণমৃগী		Eastern Line			–	–		
Subhashgram	সুভাষগ্রাম		South Lines			–	–		
Sujalpur	সুজলপুর		South Eastern Line			–	–		
Surjyapur	সূর্যপূর		South Lines			–	–		
Taherpur	তাহেরপুর		Eastern Line			–	–		
Taki Road	টাকি রোড		Eastern Line			–	–		
Takipur	টাকিপুর হল্ট		Eastern Line			–	–		
Tala	টালা		Circular Line			–	–		
Talandu	তালান্দু		Eastern Line			–	–		
Taldi	তালদি		South Lines			–	–		
Talpur	তালপুর হল্ট		Eastern Line			–	–		
Tamluk Junction	তমলুক জংশন	TMZJ	South Eastern Line			–	check		
Tarakeswar	তারকেশ্বর	TAK	Eastern Line			–	–		
Taraknagar	তারকনগর		Eastern Line			–	–		
Thakurnagar	ঠাকুরনগর		Eastern Line			–	–		
Tikiapara	টিকিয়াপাড়া		South Eastern Line			–	–		
Tikra	টিকরা		South Eastern Line			–	–		
Titagarh	টিটাগড়		Eastern Line			–	–		
Tollygunge	টালিগঞ্জ		Circular Line; South Lines			–	–		
Tribeni	ত্রিবেনী		Eastern Line			check	–		
Udairampur	উদয়রামপুর		South Lines			–	–		
Ukilerhat	উকিলেরহাট		South Lines			–	–		
Uluberia	উলুবেড়িয়া	ULB	South Eastern Line			check	check		
Uttar Radhanagar	উত্তর রাধানগর		South Lines			–	–		
Uttarpara	উত্তরপাড়া		Eastern Line			–	–		
