= Kashinagar railway station =

Railway station in West Bengal, India

Kashinagar
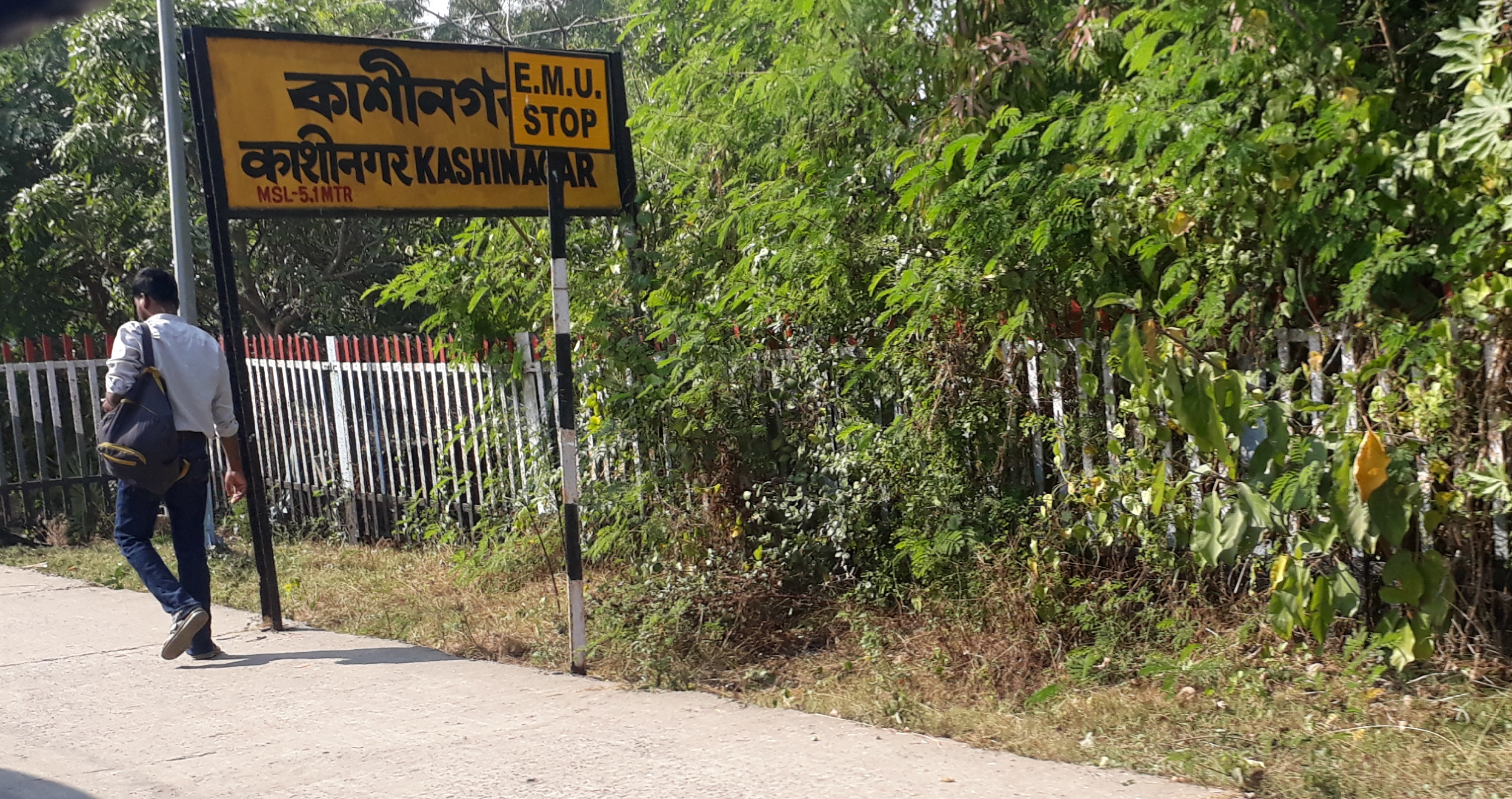

General information
- Location: Ganespur, Kashinagar, South 24 Parganas, West Bengal; India
- Coordinates: 21.905105°N 88.201131°E
- Elevation: 4 metres (13 ft)
- System: Kolkata Suburban Railway Station
- Owner: Indian Railways
- Operator: Eastern Railway
- Line: Main line
- Platforms: 2
- Tracks: 2

Construction
- Structure type: Standard (on-ground station)
- Parking: Not Available
- Cycle facilities: Not Available
- Accessible: Not Available

Other information
- Status: Functioning
- Station code: KHGR
- Zone(s): Eastern Railway
- Division(s): Sealdah

History
- Opened: 2001; 25 years ago
- Electrified: 2000–01
Services
Preceding station	Kolkata Suburban Railway	Following station
Kakdwip towards Namkhana	Sealdah South Main line	Madhabnagar towards Sealdah
Route map
Location

Kashinagar railway station is a Kolkata Suburban Railway Station on the Main line. It is under the jurisdiction of the Sealdah railway division in the Eastern Railway zone of the Indian Railways. Kashinagar railway station is situated at Ganespur, Kashinagar, South 24 Parganas district in the Indian state of West Bengal.

== History ==
In 2001, the Indian Railways constructed a 1,676 mm (5 ft 6 in)-wide broad-gauge railway from Lakshmikantapur to Kakdwip via Kashinagar.

== Electrification ==
Electrification from Lakshmikantapur to Kakdwip including Kashinagar was completed with 25 kV AC overhead system in 2000–01.

== Station complex ==
The platform is very much well sheltered. The station possesses many facilities including water and sanitation. It is well connected to the NH-12. There is a proper approach road to this station.
