= Brace Bridge railway station =

Railway station in Kolkata, India

Brace Bridge
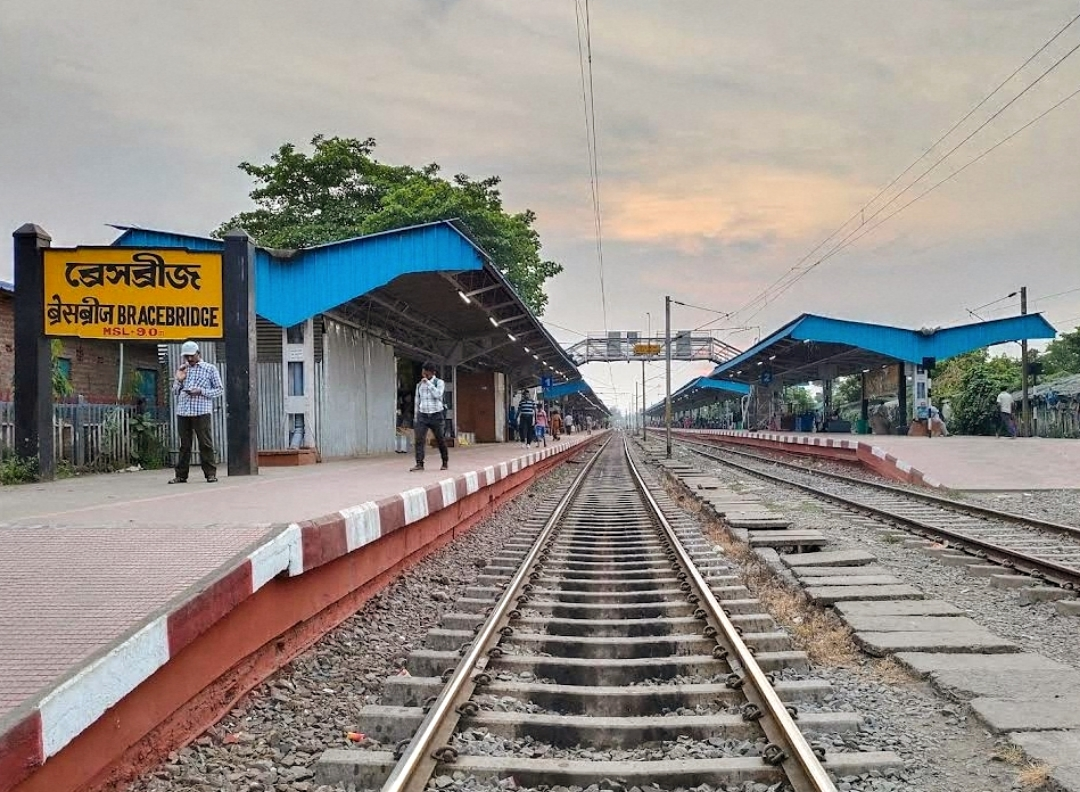
- Brace Bridge railway station

General information
- Location: Brace Bridge, Kolkata, West Bengal 700088; India
- Coordinates: 22.517909°N 88.301182°E
- Elevation: 9 metres (30 ft)
- System: Kolkata Suburban Railway station
- Owner: Indian Railways
- Operator: Eastern Railway
- Line: Budge Budge Branch line
- Platforms: 3
- Tracks: 3

Construction
- Structure type: Standard (on-ground station)
- Parking: Not available
- Cycle facilities: Not available
- Accessible: Not available

Other information
- Status: Functioning
- Station code: BRJ
- Zone(s): Eastern Railway
- Division(s): Sealdah

History
- Opened: 1890; 136 years ago
- Electrified: 1965–66
- Former names: Eastern Bengal Railway
Services
Preceding station	Kolkata Suburban Railway	Following station
Santoshpur towards Budge Budge	Sealdah South Budge Budge Branch line	Majerhat towards Sealdah
Route map
Location

Brace Bridge railway station is a Kolkata Suburban Railway station on the Budge Budge Branch line.
It is under the jurisdiction of the Sealdah railway division in the Eastern Railway zone of the Indian Railways. It serves the local areas of Brace Bridge (Jinjira Bazar) and Parnasree in Kolkata in the Indian state of West Bengal.

== History ==
In 1890, the Eastern Bengal Railway constructed a 1,676 mm (5 ft 6 in)-wide broad-gauge railway from Ballygunge Junction to Budge Budge via Brace Bridge.

== Electrification ==
Electrification from Ballygunge Junction to Budge Budge including Brace Bridge was completed with 25 kV AC overhead system in 1965–66.

== Station complex ==
The platform is well sheltered. The station possesses many facilities including water and sanitation. There is a proper approach road to this station.
