= Sealdah South section =

Railway Route in West Bengal, India

Sealdah South section

Overview
- Status: Operational
- Owner: Indian Railways
- Locale: Kolkata; South 24 Parganas
- Termini: • Sealdah; • Budge Budge • Canning • Diamond Harbour • Namkhana
- Stations: Total stations: 67; Interchange stations: 5
- Website: Eastern Railway

Service
- Type: Commuter rail
- System: Kolkata Suburban Railway
- Services: Sealdah – Diamond Harbour; Ballygunge – Majerhat – Budge Budge; Sonarpur – Canning; Baruipur – Lakshmikantapur – Namkhana
- Operator: Eastern Railway
- Depot: 1. Sonarpur EMU Carshed (with 32 rake strength)

History
- Opened: 2 January 1862; 164 years ago

Technical
- Line length: 238 km (148 mi)
- Number of tracks: 1/2/3
- Character: At-grade
- Track gauge: 5 ft 6 in (1,676 mm) broad gauge
- Electrification: 25 kV AC overhead line
- Operating speed: up to 110 km/h (68 mph)

Sealdah South section consists of a set of four lines which connect Sealdah in Kolkata with its southern suburbs and with the entire South 24 Parganas district of West Bengal, India. It is a part of the Kolkata Suburban Railway and is under the jurisdiction of the Sealdah railway division of the Eastern Railway zone of Indian Railways.

It is linked to the Sealdah Main and North section via the Kankurgachi Chord line at Park Circus and via the Kolkata Circular Railway at Majerhat Junction.

It also connects to the Kolkata Dock System Railway (KDS Railway) at Majerhat and Brace Bridge respectively.

== Services ==
The Sealdah South section consists of four lines or four sub-sections:

- Sealdah – Diamond Harbour (60 km (37 mi))
- Ballygunge Junction – Budge Budge (20 km (12 mi))
- Sonarpur Junction – Canning (29 km (18 mi))
- Baruipur Junction – Namkhana (83 km (52 mi))

The section is primarily a suburban section with a total of 334 daily services and 288 Sunday services serving the four lines of the section. A majority of the services are served by 12-car EMU rakes from the Sonarpur EMU Carshed. There are many "Galloping local" services which only stop at the important stations of a line.

The Gangasagar mela, which attracts thousands of pilgrims during Makar Sankranti in mid-January, and is held in Sagar Island is approached through the Namkhana branch line of this section. Kakdwip and Namkhana railway stations serve as handy rail heads for travel to the 'mela'. Eastern Railway runs a lot of special trains for the 'mela' to cope with the increase in passenger traffic. There also are special trains from New Delhi to Namkhana via Lucknow Junction and Allahabad Junction during 'mela'.

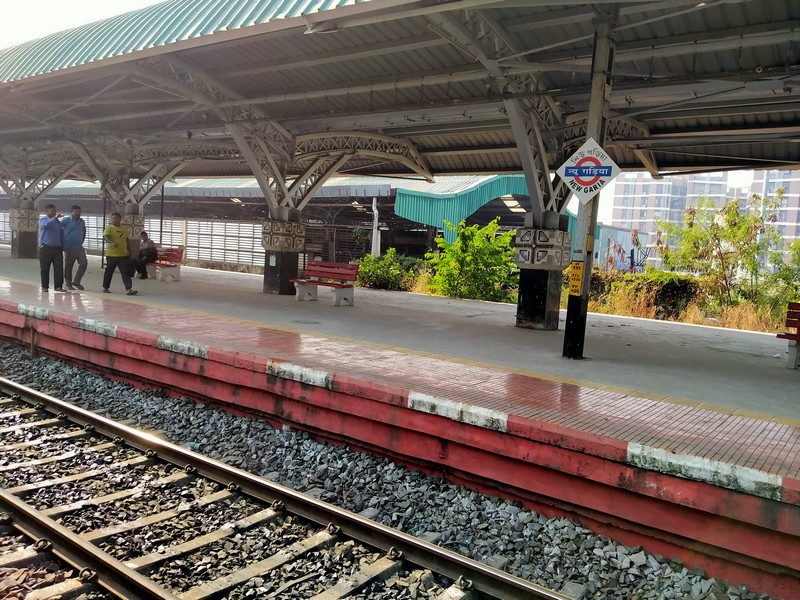
Kolkata metro blue line station New Garia from rail station

Interchanges with the Circular line are available at stations at Park Circus, Ballygunge Junction, Lake Gardens, Tollygunge, New Alipore and Majerhat stations respectively. The New Garia Station serve as major interchange with the Blue Line and Orange Line of the Kolkata Metro while Tollygunge, Sealdah and Majerhat serve as interchanges with Blue Line, Green Line and Purple Line respectively. A new metro line from New Garia to Baruipur has been proposed as well.

This section connects to the Kolkata Port, via the KDS Railway, from where major freight commodities like containers, coal and fertilizers are loaded and transferred throughout the Indian Railways network.

== History ==
=== Sealdah–Canning line ===
The Calcutta and South-Eastern Railway (reporting mark :CSER) was formed in 1859 to connect Calcutta with Port Canning on the Matla River. It constructed and completed the 45 km (28 mi) long line on 15 May 1863. It was the first railway track on the eastern bank of the Hooghly River and ran from what was then the Beliaghata railway station (presently Sealdah South railway terminus) to Port Canning on the Matla River via Jadavpur and Sonarpur.

In 1868, CSER having suffered extensive losses due to floods and other problems, sold the line to the Indian government (management then being leased to the Eastern Bengal Railway (reporting mark :EBR)) and the company was dissolved in March 1870. Thus the line became a part of the Southern section of the Eastern Bengal Railway.

Post partition of India in 1947 and re-organisation of railway zones in 1952, the entire Southern section of Eastern Bengal Railway was amalgamated under the Sealdah division of Eastern Railway.

=== Sonarpur–Diamond Harbour line ===
While multiple feasibility reports and proposals, beginning from 1839, were made for the construction of a railway line between Calcutta and Diamond Harbour, no action were taken on these.

Finally in 1883, a 44 km (27 mi) branch line to Diamond Harbour via Baruipur and Magrahat was constructed from Sonarpur on the Sealdah–Canning line of the Eastern Bengal Railway. This line, from Sealdah to Diamond Harbour, then became the main line of the Southern section of the Eastern Bengal Railway.

A small 0.81 km (0.50 mi) branch line was constructed in 1883, from Diamond Harbour to Hara Fort near the Hooghly River to transport goods and military supplies as well.

=== Ballygunge–Budge Budge line ===
The Budge Budge branch line was initially sanctioned in 1886 as a line to connect Ballygunge with the Kidderpore Docks. Sanction to an extension to Budge Budge was given in 1888 and the whole of 21 km (13 mi) long line from Ballygunge to Budge Budge via Majerhat was opened on 1890 by the Eastern Bengal Railway.

The Calcutta Port Commissioners' Railway (reporting mark :CPCR) built a branch line from Kidderpore Docks to Majerhat on 1893. It further constructed a branch line from the subsidiary marshaling yard at Brace Bridge to King George's Dock (renamed to Netaji Subhas Dock in 1973) in 1928.

=== Baruipur–Lakshmikantapur–Namkhana line ===
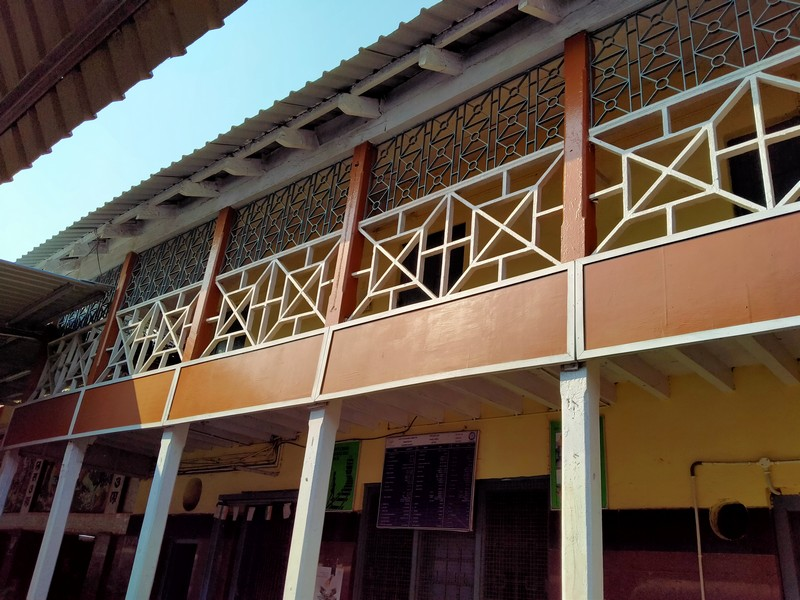
British era wooden building of Baruipur station is still standing

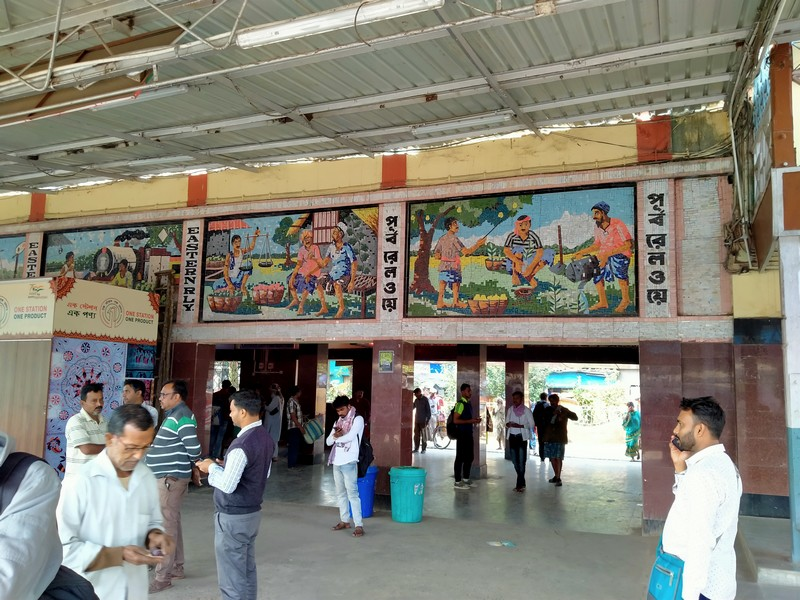
The mosaic decoration at Baruipur stations shows invention of wheel and its usage at railway.

In 1928, a 37 km (23 mi) long line from Baruipur on the Diamond Harbour branch line to Lakshmikantapur via Jaynagar Majilpur was constructed by the Eastern Bengal Railway and became a branch line of its Southern section.

In an effort to give access to remote areas and promote new growth areas, the 47 km (29 mi) long Lakshmikantapur–Namkhana line project was sanctioned in 1987-88 amongst other projects. The line was extended up to Kulpi by 1992 and was completed till Kakdwip by 2001. The Kakdwip–Namkhana section was completed by 2004.

=== Kalighat–Falta Railway ===
The Kalighat–Falta Railway (reporting mark :KFR) was a 40 km (25 mi) long narrow gauge (762 mm) railway line constructed by the Kalighat–Falta Railway Company, and operated as a part of McLeod's Light Railways, opening to traffic on 28 May 1917 from Gholeshapur (near Kalighat) to Falta. Gholeshapur was connected to Majerhat junction on the Eastern Bengal Railway on 1920. The railway line was closed on 1955 due to ever increasing losses. The tracks were dismantled and the land was reclaimed to build a road, now called James Long Sarani, in Behala.

== Electrification ==
The Sealdah South section lines are fully electrified with 25 kV AC overhead system. The electrification process was started in 1965 from Sealdah to Lakshmikantapur line and the other lines in this division with the different phases and completed up to 1966 from that time the whole division is also fully electrified.

== EMU Carshed ==
The Sealdah South section is primarily served by all 12 Coach EMU rakes from the Sonarpur (SPR) EMU Carshed. They are also served with a few 12 Coach EMU rakes from the Narkeldanga (NKG), Barasat (BT) and Ranaghat (RHA) EMU Carshed which comes to Sealdah South as North/Main to South Link Trains via Kolkata Circular Railway.

While the section was initially served by the Narkeldanga EMU carshed which opened on 1963, a need for a dedicated EMU carshed for the section led to the construction of the Sonarpur EMU carshed in 1978. This reduced the inconvenience faced by the overburdened Narkeldanga EMU Carshed.

As of November 2021, the Sonarpur Carshed had 32 12 Coach EMU rakes which exclusively served the Sealdah South section.

== Routes and stations ==
=== Stations ===
Names in bold indicate that the station is a galloping train stop as well as important terminal station.

==== Sealdah–Diamond Harbour line ====
Sealdah–Diamond Harbour line
Sl No.	Distance from Sealdah South (km)	Station name	Station code	Connections	Station category	District
1	0	**Sealdah South**	SDAH	Sealdah Main and North section / Sealdah	NSG-1	Kolkata
2	3	Park Circus	PQS	Circular	SG-3	Kolkata
3	6	**Ballygunge Junction**	BLN	Circular / Budge Budge branch line	SG-3	Kolkata
4	7	Dhakuria	DHK	–	SG-3	Kolkata
5	8	**Jadabpur**	JDP	–	SG-3	Kolkata
6	10	Baghajatin	BGJT	–	SG-3	Kolkata
7	12	New Garia	NGRI	Kavi Subhash	SG-3	Kolkata
8	13	Garia	GIA	–	SG-3	South 24 Parganas
9	15	Narendrapur	NRPR	–	HG-3	South 24 Parganas
10	17	**Sonarpur Junction**	SPR	Canning branch line	SG-2	South 24 Parganas
11	20	Subhasgram	SBGR	–	SG-2	South 24 Parganas
12	22	Mallikpur	MAK	–	SG-3	South 24 Parganas
13	25	**Baruipur Junction**	BRP	Namkhana branch line	SG-2	South 24 Parganas
14	28	Kalyanpur	KYP	–	SG-3	South 24 Parganas
15	30	Dakshin Durgapur	DKDP	–	SG-3	South 24 Parganas
16	32	**Hotar**	HT	–	SG-3	South 24 Parganas
17	34	Dhamua	DMU	–	SG-3	South 24 Parganas
18	37	Uttar Radhanagar	UTN	–	HG-3	South 24 Parganas
19	40	**Magra Hat**	MGT	–	SG-3	South 24 Parganas
20	43	Bahirpuya Halt	BHPA	–	HG-3	South 24 Parganas
21	45	Sangrampur	SNU	–	SG-3	South 24 Parganas
22	50	**Deula**	D	–	SG-3	South 24 Parganas
23	53	Netra	NTA	–	SG-3	South 24 Parganas
24	55	**Basuldanga**	BSD	–	SG-3	South 24 Parganas
25	57	Gurudas Nagar	GURN	–	SG-3	South 24 Parganas
26	60	**Diamond Harbour**	DH	–	SG-3	South 24 Parganas

==== Budge Budge branch line ====
Budge Budge branch line
#	Distance from Ballygunge (km)	Station name	Station code	Connections	Station category	District
1	0	**Ballygunge Junction**^{†}	BLN	Sealdah–Diamond Harbour line / Circular	SG-3	Kolkata
2	2	Lake Gardens	LKF	Circular	SG-3	Kolkata
3	3	Tollygunge	TLG	Circular / Rabindra Sarobar	SG-3	Kolkata
4	4	**New Alipore**	NACC	Circular	SG-3	Kolkata
5	6	**Majerhat**	MJT	Circular / Majerhat	SG-3	Kolkata
6	8	**Brace Bridge**	BRJ	–	SG-3	Kolkata
7	11	Santoshpur	SSP	–	SG-3	South 24 Parganas
8	13	**Akra**	AKRA	–	SG-3	South 24 Parganas
9	17	**Nangi**	NAI	–	SG-3	South 24 Parganas
10	19	**Komagata Maru Budge Budge**	KBGB	–	SG-3	South 24 Parganas
† – Branch line starts at Ballygunge Junction

==== Canning branch line ====
Canning branch line
#	Distance from Sonarpur (km)	Station name	Station code	Connections	Station category	District
1	0	**Sonarpur Junction**^{†}	SPR	Sealdah–Diamond Harbour line	SG-2	South 24 Parganas
2	3	Bidyadharpur	BDYP	–	SG-3	South 24 Parganas
3	6	Kalikapur	KLKR	–	SG-3	South 24 Parganas
4	7	**Champahati**	CHT	–	SG-3	South 24 Parganas
5	10	Piali	PLF	–	SG-3	South 24 Parganas
6	12	Gourdaha	GQD	–	HG-3	South 24 Parganas
7	15	**Ghutiari Sharif**	GOF	–	SG-3	South 24 Parganas
8	18	Betberia Ghola	BTPG	–	HG-3	South 24 Parganas
9	22	**Taldi**	TLX	–	SG-3	South 24 Parganas
10	25	Matla Halt	MATL	–	HG-3	South 24 Parganas
11	28	**Canning**	CG	–	SG-3	South 24 Parganas
† – Branch line starts at Sonarpur Junction

==== Namkhana branch line ====
Namkhana branch line
#	Distance from Baruipur (km)	Station name	Station code	Connections	Station category	District
1	0	**Baruipur Junction^{†}**	BRP	Sealdah–Diamond Harbour line	SG-2	South 24 Parganas
2	2	Shasan Road	SSRD	–	SG-3	South 24 Parganas
3	5	Krishna Mohan	KRXM	–	HG-3	South 24 Parganas
4	7	**Dhapdhapi**	DPDP	–	SG-3	South 24 Parganas
5	9	Surjyapur	SJPR	–	SG-3	South 24 Parganas
6	11	**Gocharan**	GCN	–	SG-3	South 24 Parganas
7	14	Hogla	HGA	–	HG-3	South 24 Parganas
8	17	**Dakshin Barasat**	DBT	–	SG-3	South 24 Parganas
9	20	Baharu	BARU	–	SG-3	South 24 Parganas
10	25	**Jaynagar Majilpur**	JNM	–	SG-3	South 24 Parganas
11	29	**Mathurapur Road**	MPRD	–	SG-3	South 24 Parganas
12	34	Madhabpur	MDBP	–	HG-3	South 24 Parganas
13	37	**Lakshmikantapur**	LKPR	–	SG-3	South 24 Parganas
14	42	Udairampur	URP	–	HG-3	South 24 Parganas
15	46	Kulpi	KLW	–	HG-3	South 24 Parganas
16	51	Karanjali	KNJI	–	HG-3	South 24 Parganas
17	57	Nischintapur Market	NCPM	–	HG-3	South 24 Parganas
18	59	**Nischintapur**	NCP	–	HG-3	South 24 Parganas
19	63	Madhabnagar	MDGB	–	HG-3	South 24 Parganas
20	67	Kashinagar	KHGR	–	SG-3	South 24 Parganas
21	70	**Kakdwip**	KWDP	–	SG-3	South 24 Parganas
22	78	Ukilerhat	UKLR	–	HG-3	South 24 Parganas
23	85	**Namkhana**	NMKA	–	SG-3	South 24 Parganas
† – Branch line starts at Baruipur Junction

== Planned extensions ==
Multiple new lines and extensions on this section have been planned by the Eastern Railway; however, most remain blocked due to land issues.

Budge Budge–Pujali–Uluberia (Birshibpur) line

The 11 km (6.8 mi) long Budge Budge–Pujali line was sanctioned in the railway budget on 2009-10 while a 10.25 km (6.37 mi) extension from Pujali to Birshibpur near Uluberia on the Howrah–Kharagpur line was sanctioned in 2011–12. Once completed this will connect the South Eastern Railway network under Kharagpur division directly with the Majerhat station in the Sealdah South section of the Eastern Railway via a bridge over the Hooghly river. As of 2021, work could not be started on this extension due to non-availability of land and as such the project had been kept under abeyance.

Kalikapur–Ghatakpukur–Minakhan line

In the 2011-12 railway budget, a 38 km (24 mi) long line from Kalikapur on the Canning branch line to Minakhan via Ghatakpukur was sanctioned. However, work could not be started on this extension due to non-availability of land and as such the project had been kept under abeyance as of 2021.

Canning–Jharkhali extension

A 4.84 km (3.01 mi) extension from Canning to Bhangankhali was sanctioned in the 2009-10 railway budget with a railway bridge proposed over the Matla river. In 2011-12 this line was further proposed to be extended by 14.3 km (8.9 mi) to Basanti from where another extension of 23 km (14 mi) to Jharkhali was planned to be taken up. However, work could not be started on this extension due to non-availability of land and as such the project had been kept under abeyance as of 2021.

Planned branches to Raidighi and Durgapur

The 20 km (12 mi) long Jaynagar Majilpur–Raidighi line via Krishnachandrapur was sanctioned in 2009–10. In 2011-12 railway budget, a 25 km (16 mi) long new line from Sangrampur on the Sealdah–Diamond Harbour line to Krishnachandrapur was sanctioned along with a 32 km (20 mi) new line from Jaynagar Majilpur to Durgapur. However, work could not be started on this extension due to non-availability of land and as such the project had been kept under abeyance as of 2021.

Namkhana–Chandranagar–Bakkhali extension

The Namkhana branch line was sanctioned to be extended by 14 km (8.7 mi) to Chandranagar in 2009-10 and then by 17.2 km (10.7 mi) km to Bakkhali in 2011–12. However, work could not be started on this extension due to non-availability of land and as such the project had been kept under abeyance as of 2021.

Dankuni–Sagar Island rail line

While there have been multiple proposals to build a railway line to Sagar Island, none have been constructed yet. In 2017, a preliminary survey for a 138 km (86 mi) long line was sanctioned by the Indian Railways in order to boost connectivity between Dankuni and the proposed deep sea port at Sagar Island. The below sections are supposed to be a part of the line if built:

- Pujali–Bankrahat–Diamond Harbour (Gurudasnagar)–Kulpi line: The 10 km (6.2 mi) Pujali–Bankrahat line and the 21 km (13 mi) Diamond Harbour (Gurudas Nagar)–Bankrahat line were sanctioned in 2011-12 railway budget. The 17.25 km (10.72 mi) Diamond Harbour (Gurudas Nagar)–Kulpi line was sanctioned in 2012–13. As of 2021, work could not be started on this extension due to non-availability of land and as such the project had been kept under abeyance.
- Kakdwip–Budakholi–Sagar Island line: A 5 km (3.1 mi) extension from Kakdwip to Budhakholi was sanctioned in the 2011-12 railway budget with plans to further extend it to Sagar Island via a rail-road bridge. As of 2021, work could not be started on this extension due to non-availability of land and as such the project had been kept under abeyance.
