= Sonarpur Junction railway station =

Railway Station in West Bengal, India

Sonarpur Junction
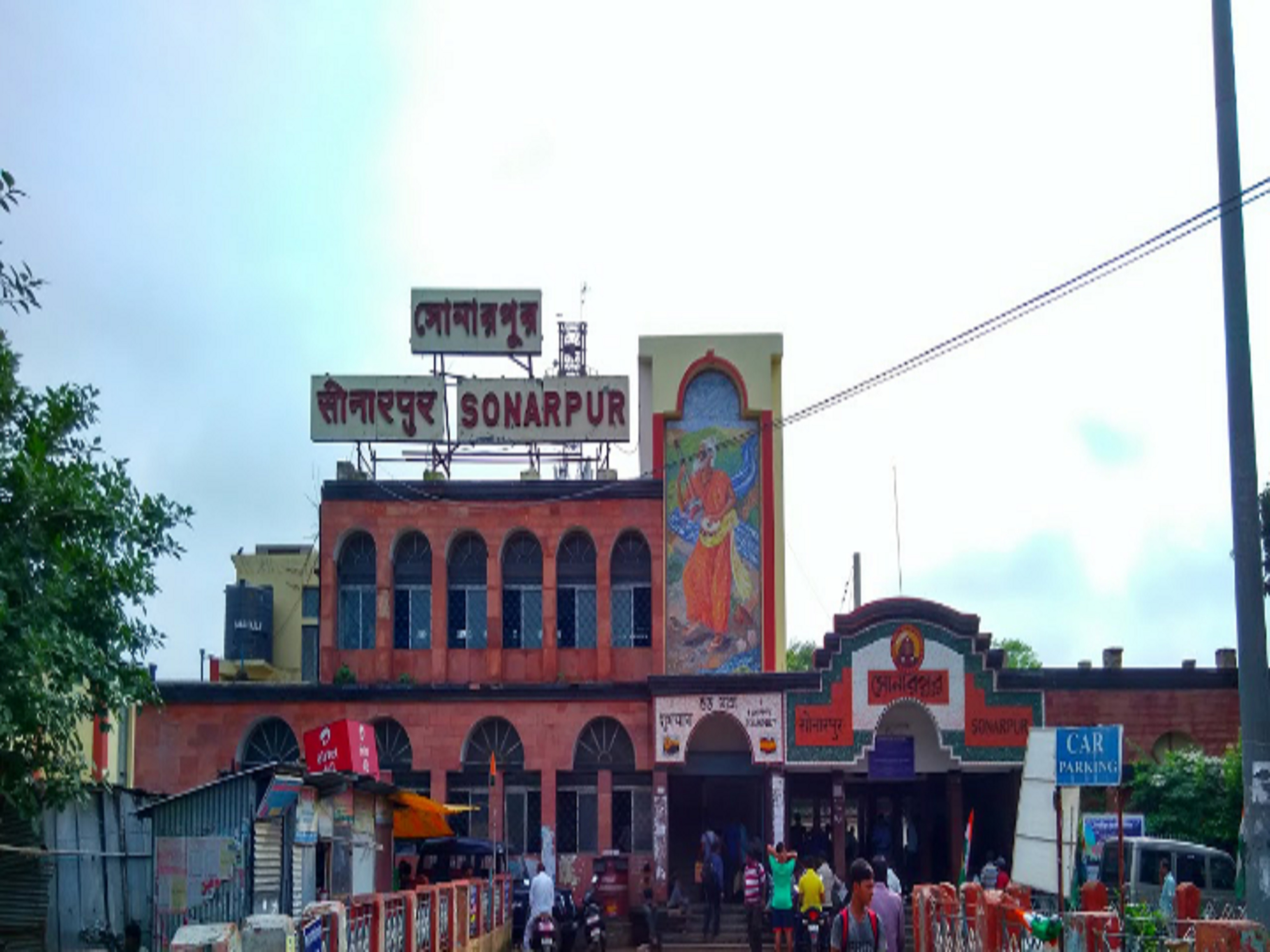
- Sonarpur Junction railway station

General information
- Location: Rajpur Sonarpur, South 24 Parganas, West Bengal; India
- Coordinates: 22.4427478°N 88.4309013°E
- Elevation: 9 metres (30 ft)
- System: Kolkata Suburban Railway Junction station
- Owner: Indian Railways
- Operator: Eastern Railway
- Lines: Main line Canning Branch line
- Platforms: 4
- Tracks: 4
- Connections: Bus stand

Construction
- Structure type: At grade
- Parking: Available
- Cycle facilities: Available
- Accessible: Available

Other information
- Status: Functioning
- Station code: SPR
- Zone(s): Eastern Railway
- Division(s): Sealdah

History
- Opened: 1862; 164 years ago
- Electrified: 1965–66
- Former names: Eastern Bengal Railway
Services
Preceding station	Kolkata Suburban Railway	Following station
Subhashgram towards Baruipur Junction	Sealdah South Main line & Canning Branch line	Narendrapur towards Sealdah
Bidyadharpur towards Canning	Sealdah South Main line & Canning Branch line	Narendrapur towards Sealdah
Route map
Location

Sonarpur Junction railway station is a Kolkata Suburban Railway Junction station on the main line with an approximate 17 kilometres (11 mi) distance from the Sealdah railway station. It is under the jurisdiction of the Eastern Railway zone of Indian Railways. Sonarpur Junction railway station is one of the busiest railway stations in the Sealdah railway division. More than 115 pairs of EMU local trains pass through the railway station on a daily basis. It is situated in South 24 Parganas district in the Indian state of West Bengal. Sonarpur Junction railway station serves Rajpur Sonarpur and the surrounding areas.

== Geography ==
Sonarpur Junction railway station is located at 22°26′34″N 88°25′51″E. It has an average elevation of 9 metres (30 ft).

== History ==
In 1862, the Eastern Bengal Railway constructed a 1,676 mm (5 ft 6 in)-wide broad-gauge railway from Sealdah to Sonarpur Junction.

== Electrification ==
Electrification from Sealdah to Sonarpur Junction was completed with 25 kV AC overhead system in 1965–66.

== Station complex ==
The platform is well sheltered. The station possesses many facilities including water and sanitation. It is well connected to the SH-1. There is a proper approach road to this station.
