= Categorization of Indian Railway stations by commercial importance =

Indian railways classification of stations by commercial importance

Indian Railways classifies its railway stations based on commercial and strategic importance under various categories in order to ascertain, plan and provide minimum essential amenities for passengers using them. While the primary criteria for determining the importance of a station was purely based on the station revenue and earnings, it was changed in December 2017 to better cover stations with high footfalls and strategic importance as well.

== History ==
From the 1890s, basic passenger amenities like toilets, gas lamps and electric lighting were introduced in various railway stations of India. However, there was no uniform criteria set for providing passenger amenities or organizing railway stations based on commercial importance. Thus after the independence of India, the 1949 Railway Convention Committee recommended a development fund of ₹3 crore (equivalent to ₹331 crore or US$39 million in 2023) for providing basic amenities to passengers every year. In 1952, Indian Railways laid the guidelines with regards to passenger amenities like booking arrangement, waiting halls, benches, suitable lighting arrangements, drinking water, latrines, shady trees, rail level platforms of suitable length amongst others. These guidelines were revised in the year 1995 and a classification system for passenger amenities was set up based on the annual passenger earnings of a railway station. Stations were initially categorized into five categories namely A, B, C, D & E depending upon the earnings, which was considered to be an indicator of the passenger traffic. These categories and criterion were planned to be revised every five years from 1995 to 1996. In 1999, a sixth category namely F was introduced to cover all halt stations while the criteria for the other categories were revised. All suburban stations were grouped under C category to accord them higher priority while category A & B were modified to classify stations with higher passenger traffic. The criteria for these categories were again revised in 2003. In 2007, a new category A1 was introduced to classify railway stations with annual earnings of more than ₹50 crore to ensure the provision of best amenities at the most important of railway stations.

While this classification was useful for categorizing stations with higher earnings, it didn't take into account stations with high number of footfalls like Kalyan, Panvel and Tambaram which led to them being eligible only for lower number of amenities. In December 2017, the entire categorization system was comprehensively revised taking into account passenger footfall, earnings and strategic importance with a view to plan various passenger services and passenger amenities at stations in a more effective and focused manner in order to help the passenger have a better experience in relation to travel amenities at stations. Stations were categorized into the Non-Suburban Groups - NSG-1 to NSG-6, Suburban Groups - SG-1 to SG-3, and Halt Groups - HG1 to HG3. General Managers of the various zones of the Indian railways were also given the power to designate a lower grade station as NSG-4 category if it was a place of tourist importance and/or was an important junction station.

== Station Categories ==
=== Current (2017-Present) ===
Criteria for categorization of stations based on commercial importance (post 2017)
| Category of stations | Criteria of Earnings (in Rs.) | Criteria of outward Passengers handled |
|---|---|---|
Non Suburban
| NSG-1 | More than 500 Crore | More than 20 Million |
| NSG-2 | 100 to 500 Crore | 10 to 20 Million |
| NSG-3 | 20 to 100 Crore | 5 to 10 Million |
| NSG-4 | 10 to 20 Crore | 2 to 5 Million |
| NSG-5 | 1 to 10 Crore | 1 to 2 Million |
| NSG-6 | Up to 1 Crore | Up to 1 Million |
Suburban
| SG-1 | More than 25 Crore | More than 30 Million |
| SG-2 | 10 to 25 Crore | 10 to 30 Million |
| SG-3 | Up to 10 Crore | Up to 10 Million |
Halts
| HG-1 | More than 50 Lakh | More than 300 thousand |
| HG-2 | 5 to 50 lakh | 100 thousand to 300 thousand |
| HG-3 | Up to 5 lakh | Up to 100 thousand |

=== Previous (1995-2017) ===
Criteria for categorization of stations based on commercial importance (1995–2017)
| Category | Criteria |
|---|---|
| A1 | Non-Suburban stations with an annual passenger earning of more than Rs. 60 crores. |
| A | Non-suburban stations with an annual passenger earnings of Rs. 8 crores and up to Rs 60 crores. |
| B | I. Non suburban stations with annual passenger earnings between Rs. 4 crores to Rs. 8 crores. II. Stations of tourist importance or an important junction station (to be decided by General Manager). |
| C | All suburban stations |
| D | Non suburban stations with passenger earnings between Rs. 60 lakhs and Rs. 4 crores. |
| E | Non suburban stations with passenger earnings less than Rs. 60 lakhs |
| F | Halts |

== See also ==
- List of railway stations in India
