= Baruipur Junction railway station =

Railway Station in West Bengal, India

Baruipur Junction
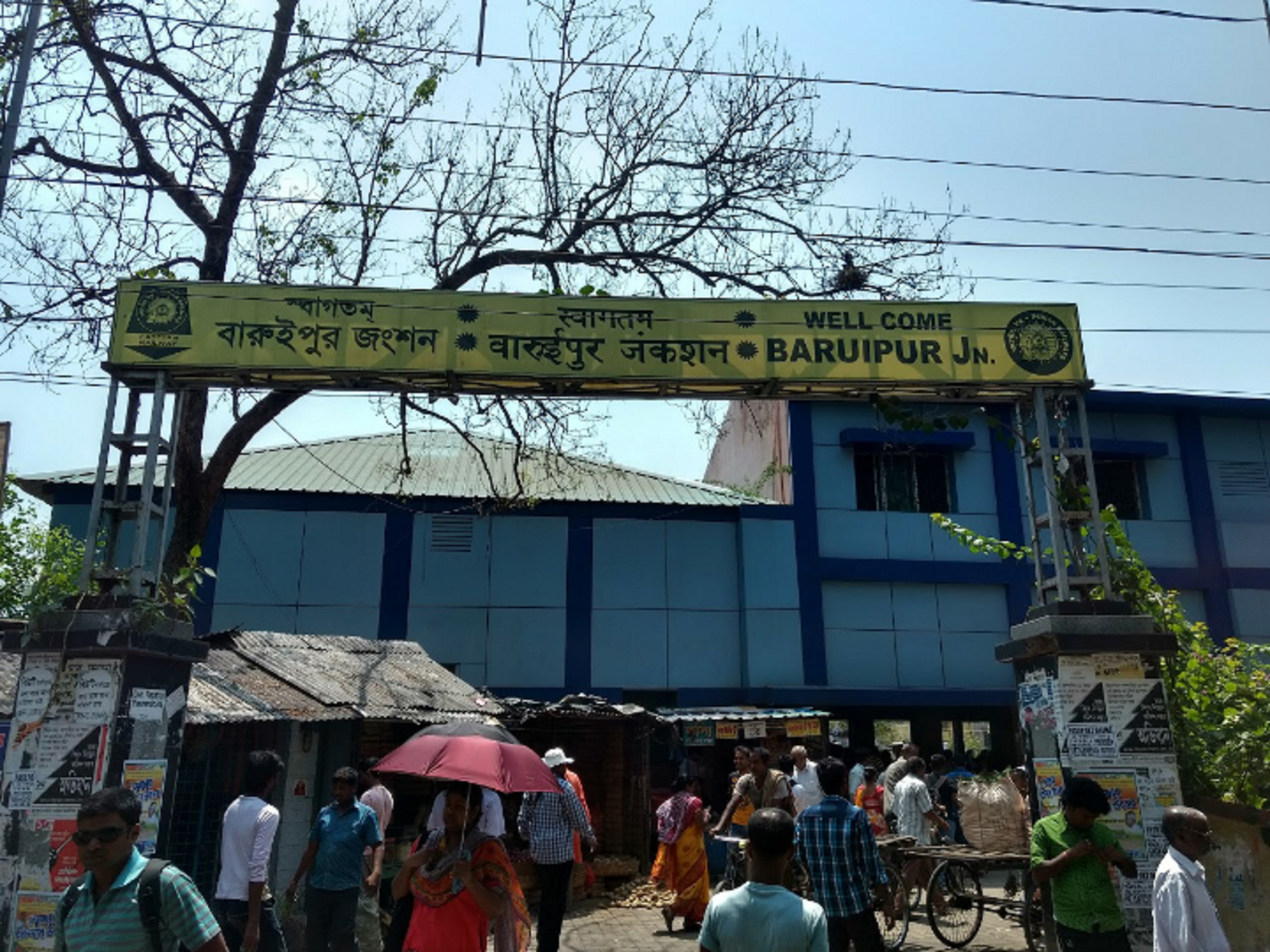
- Baruipur Junction Railway Station

General information
- Location: Baruipur, South 24 Parganas, West Bengal; India
- Coordinates: 22.3658265°N 88.4310842°E
- Elevation: 9 metres (30 ft)
- System: Kolkata Suburban Railway
- Owner: Indian Railways
- Operator: Eastern Railway
- Lines: Main line Diamond Harbour Branch line
- Platforms: 4
- Tracks: 4
- Connections: Bus stand

Construction
- Structure type: At grade
- Parking: Available
- Cycle facilities: Available
- Accessible: Available

Other information
- Status: Functioning
- Station code: BRP
- Zone(s): Eastern Railway
- Division(s): Sealdah

History
- Opened: 1882; 144 years ago
- Electrified: 1965–66
- Former names: Eastern Bengal Railway
Services
Preceding station	Kolkata Suburban Railway	Following station
Shasan Road towards Namkhana	Sealdah South Main line & Diamond Harbour Branch line	Mallikpur towards Sealdah
Kalyanpur towards Diamond Harbour	Sealdah South Main line & Diamond Harbour Branch line	Mallikpur towards Sealdah
Route map
Location

Baruipur Junction railway station is a Kolkata Suburban Railway Junction Station on the Main line with an approximate 25 kilometres (16 mi) distance from the Sealdah railway station. It is under the jurisdiction of the Eastern Railway zone of Indian Railways. Baruipur Junction railway station is one of the busiest railway stations in the Sealdah railway division. More than 80 pairs of EMU local trains pass through the railway station on a daily basis. It is situated in South 24 Parganas district in the Indian state of West Bengal. Baruipur Junction railway station serves Baruipur and the surrounding areas.

== Geography ==
Baruipur Junction railway station is located at 22°21′57″N 88°25′52″E. It has an average elevation of 9 metres (30 ft).

== History ==
In 1882, the Eastern Bengal Railway constructed a 1,676 mm (5 ft 6 in)-wide broad-gauge railway from Sonarpur Junction to Jaynagar Majilpur via Baruipur Junction.

== Electrification ==
Electrification from Sonarpur Junction to Jaynagar Majilpur including Baruipur Junction was completed with 25 kV AC overhead system in 1965–66.

== Station complex ==
The platform is very much well sheltered. The station possesses many facilities including water and sanitation. It is well connected to the SH-1. There is a proper approach road to this station.
