= Sealdah railway division =

Railway division in West Bengal, India

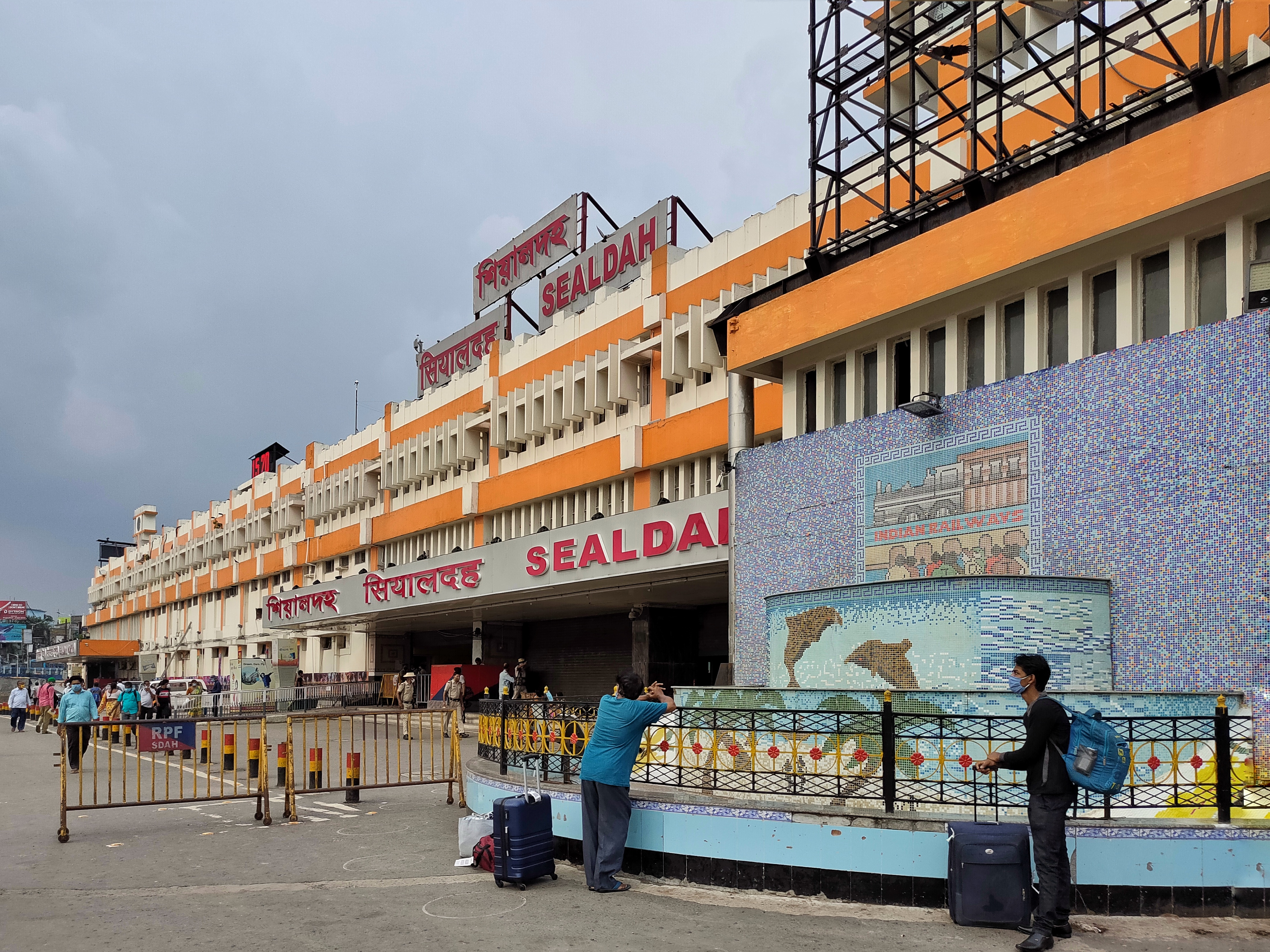
- Sealdah Division Headquarters at the Sealdah railway station

Overview
- Stations called at: 205
- Headquarters: Divisional Railway Managers's Office, DRM Building, Eastern Railway, Sealdah Division, Kaiser Street, Kolkata-700014
- Locale: Kolkata, North 24 Parganas, South 24 Parganas, Nadia, Murshidabad
- Dates of operation: 14 April 1952–

Technical
- Track gauge: 1,676 mm (5 ft 6 in) broad gauge
- Electrification: 25 kV AC railway electrification
- Length: 715.34 kilometres (444.49 mi)

Sealdah railway division is one of the four railway divisions under the jurisdiction of Eastern Railway zone of the Indian Railways. Its headquarters is located in Kaiser Street in Kolkata, West Bengal near the Sealdah railway station. Geographically the division covers the railway tracks and services in the areas between the Hooghly river on the west, Bangladesh on the north and east and the Sundarbans in the south. The Railway network under Sealdah Division was part of the Eastern Bengal Railway (present-day Bangladesh Railway). The Eastern Bengal Railway was formed on 1 July 1884. On 1 January 1942, Assam Bengal Railway (present-day Northeast Frontier Railway) and Eastern Bengal Railway were amalgamated to form Bengal Assam Railway. Sealdah Division became a part of East Indian Railway (present-day Eastern Railway and East Central Railway) on 15 August 1947, after the Partition of India and Partition of Bengal. The East Indian Railway was formed on 1 June 1845. On 14 April 1952, East Indian Railway was renamed as Eastern Railway.

== Services ==
The division primarily serves five major districts of the state of West Bengal in India, namely the Kolkata, North 24 Parganas, South 24 Parganas, Nadia and Murshidabad districts. The division forms the eastern part of the Kolkata Suburban Railway with numerous daily EMU services connecting Kolkata with the suburban areas of the five districts. The Sealdah railway station handles 124 mail/express trains connecting it to various parts of India along with 34 passenger trains & 921 suburban EMU train services, daily, while the Kolkata railway station handles 72 mail/express trains connecting it to various parts of India along with 4 passenger trains & 31 suburban EMU train services, daily. The Kolkata terminal also acts as an international passenger terminal for trains destined to Bangladesh namely the Maitree Express and Bandhan Express services. Being located in the central business district of Kolkata, the Sealdah station plays a vital role in the management of suburban railway traffic. Suburban services are also provided to the Hooghly and Howrah districts via the Naihati–Bandel branch line and the Calcutta Chord link line.

Kolkata, Barrackpore, Diamond Harbour, Dakshineswar, Krishnanagar, Nabadwip Ghat, Murshidabad, Plassey, Shantipur, Sagar Island and the Sundarbans are some of the major tourist and pilgrimage spots served by the division.

The division handles international freight and passenger traffic with Bangladesh through the Gede and Petrapole stations. The major commodities loaded from this division are containers, gunny bales, coal and fertilizers. Gunny bales are loaded from Titagarh and Naihati, while containers are loaded from Container Corporation of India sidings at Kolkata Dock, Kidderpore Dock and Cossipore Container Rail Terminal whereas coal and fertilizers are loaded from Kidderpore Dock. An average 121 numbers of Freight wagons are interchanged daily wise in average via Gede and Petrapole interchanging points with for the financial year 2019–20 with Bangladesh Railway as well. The major commodities received by this division are cement, fertilizers, food grains, containers, POL and coal for thermal power plants. The division also has 15 good sheds and 15 industrial sidings by which average interchange of this division is 28.21 rakes per day.

== Routes ==
The total route length of the division is 715.34 km (444.49 mi) of which 690.075 km (428.793 mi) is fully electrified. The division is divided into 2 sections namely the Sealdah Main and North section and the Sealdah South section. The Sealdah Main section handles long-distance trains to the rest of India while the Sealdah North section is a suburban section primarily serving the Northern districts of North 24 Parganas, Nadia and Murshidabad. The Sealdah South section is completely a suburban section connecting the Kolkata district with the numerous towns and villages of the South 24 Paraganas district and the Sundarbans. Both the sections are connected with each other via the Kolkata Circular Railway.

The following routes fall under the jurisdiction of the division:

- Sealdah Main and North section
  - Sealdah–Ranaghat–Gede line
  - Naihati–Bandel branch line (Naihati Junction railway station only)
  - Calcutta Chord link line (up to Bally Halt railway station)
  - Ranaghat–Krishnanagar City–Lalgola line
  - Shantipur loop line
  - Krishnanagar City–Nabadwip Ghat line (under conversion to broad-gauge and extension)
  - Sealdah–Bangaon line
  - Barasat–Hasnabad branch line
  - Ranaghat–Bangaon branch line
- Sealdah South section
  - Sealdah–Diamond Harbour line
  - Budge Budge branch line
  - Canning branch line
  - Namkhana branch line
- Kolkata Circular Railway

The division connects with the Kolkata Dock System Railway (KDS Railway) at Majerhat and Brace Bridge stations respectively.

== History ==
The Eastern Bengal Railway (reporting mark :EBR) company was formed in 1857 for the construction and working of a line from Calcutta to Dacca, with a branch to Jessore. The construction of the 112 mi (180 km) long broad gauge line began in 1859 and was completed in stages up to Kushtia by 1864 but the planned branch to Jessore was not built. The company also acquired a steam vessel service operating between Kushtia and Dacca on the Padma river. In 1871 the line was extended from Poradaha to a new ferry terminal at Goalundo Ghat, about 45 mi (72 km) east of Kushtia and reducing the river trip to Dacca. and becoming the main line of the Eastern section of EBR. With the successful construction and opening of the Hardinge Bridge in 1915 and gauge conversion of the Santahar–Parbatipur–Siliguri line from 1924 to 1926, the Calcutta–Siliguri broad gauge line was completed and became the main line of the Eastern section of EBR.

The Bengal Central Railway (reporting mark :BCR) company constructed two broad gauge lines: one connecting Ranaghat and Bangaon (21 mi (34 km)) in 1882 and the other connecting Dum Dum with Khulna (now in Bangladesh), via Bangaon (108 mi (174 km)) which opened in stages and was completed in 1884. These lines were merged with Eastern Bengal Railway in 1904, with the Sealdah–Bangaon–Jessore–Khulna line becoming the main line of the Central section of EBR.

The Martin's Light Railways (reporting mark :MLR) company constructed and opened the 20 mi (32 km) long, 2 ft 6 in (762 mm) narrow gauge Ranaghat–Krishnanagar Light Railway line from Aistalaghat (near Ranaghat on the right bank of Churni river) to Krishnanagar via Shantipur in 1899. This line was amalgamated with EBR on 1 July 1904. EBR further extended the line from Krishnanagar to Nabadwip Ghat and opened the line for traffic from 30 June 1926. EBR further built a 1 mi (1.6 km) long 5 ft 6 in (1,676 mm) broad gauge extension from Ranaghat to the left bank of Churni River on 1902. In 1925 an alternate 5 ft 6 in (1,676 mm) broad gauge line was built from Kalinarayanpur (Churni Bridge) to Shantipur and the old 2 ft 6 in (762 mm) gauge line between Shantipur and Aistola Ghat was abandoned. The 94.28 mi (151.73 km) long Murshidabad Branch railway was constructed by EBR from Ranaghat to Lalgola Ghat in stages from 1905 to 1907.

MLR also constructed and opened a 26 mi (42 km) long 2 ft 6 in (762 mm) narrow gauge line from Barasat to Basirhat in 1905, known as the Barasat–Basirhat Light Railway (reporting mark :BBLR). It was further extended via Taki to Hasnabad (Chingrighata) in 1909. A 16.62 miles (26.75 km) long extension was built from Beliaghata Bridge on the Barasat–Basirhat line to Patipukur in 1910. This was further extended to Belgachia in 1914 and was known as the Shyambazar Branch.

On the southern side, the Calcutta and South-Eastern Railway (reporting mark :CSER) was formed in 1859 to connect Calcutta with Port Canning on the Matla River. It constructed and completed the 45 km (28 mi) long line on 15 May 1863. It was the first railway track on the eastern bank of the Hooghly River and ran from what was then the Beliaghata railway station (presently Sealdah South railway terminus) to Port Canning on the Matla River via Jadavpur and Sonarpur. In 1868, CSER having suffered extensive losses due to floods and other problems, sold the line to the Indian government (management then being leased to the Eastern Bengal Railway) and the company was dissolved in March 1870. Thus the line became a part of the Southern Section of the Eastern Bengal Railway.

In 1883, a 44 km (27 mi) branch line to Diamond Harbour via Baruipur and Magrahat was constructed from Sonarpur on the Sealdah–Canning line of the Eastern Bengal Railway.This line, from Sealdah to Diamond Harbour, then became the main line of the Southern section of the Eastern Bengal Railway. The Budge Budge branch line was initially sanctioned in 1886 as a line to connect Ballygunge with the Kidderpore Docks. Sanction to an extension to Budge Budge was given in 1888 and the whole of 19 km (12 mi) long line from Ballygunge to Budge Budge via Majerhat was opened on 1890 by the Eastern Bengal Railway. The Calcutta Ports Commissioner's Railway (reporting mark :CPCR) built a branch line from Kidderpore Docks to Majerhat on 1893. It further constructed a branch line from the subsidiary marshaling yard at Brace Bridge to King George's Dock (renamed to Netaji Subhas Dock in 1973) in 1928. In 1928, a 37 km (23 mi) long line from Baruipur on the Diamond Harbour branch line to Lakshmikantapur via Jaynagar Majilpur was constructed by the Eastern Bengal Railway and became a branch line of its Southern section.

In 1942, EBR was merged with the Assam Bengal Railway (reporting mark :ABR) to form the Bengal and Assam Railway (reporting mark :B&AR).

Post the partition of India in 1947, the Eastern and Central sections of EBR were divided between India and East Pakistan. The direct connection between South Bengal and North Bengal was affected as the Calcutta–Siliguri line was snapped resulting in Haldibari–Chilahati and Gede–Darsana becoming international transit points for trains. In the Central section, Petrapole railway station was created as the terminus on the Indian side while the Benapole railway station became the terminus in the East Pakistani side of the line. All the railway lines east of Hooghly, south of Lalgola and west of East Pakistan that were under EBR were reorganised to be under the Sealdah division. The Sealdah division became a part of the Eastern Railway after the reorganization of railway zones on 14 April 1952.

The Barasat–Basirhat Light Railway closed down in 1955 due to increasing losses. However a new 5 ft 6 in (1,676 mm) broad gauge line was built in a new alignment between Barasat and Hasnabad from 1957 to 1962. The Shyambazar branch line was abandoned. In an effort to give access to remote areas and promote new growth areas, the 47 km (29 mi) long Lakshmikantapur–Namkhana line project was sanctioned in 1987-88 amongst other projects. The line was extended up to Kulpi by 1992 and was completed till Kakdwip by 2001. The Kakdwip–Namkhana section was completed by 2004. The Baghbazar-Prinsep Ghat line was rehabilitated and commissioned for passenger traffic on 15 August 1984 and services were subsequently extended northwards towards Tala and finally to Dum Dum by 17 June 1990. The Prinsep Ghat-Majerhat elevated section was commissioned in 2005 thus completing the Circular railway line.

== List of major railway stations by commercial importance ==
The list includes the number of railway stations under the Sealdah railway division categorized by their commercial importance. Only major railway stations (Note: Major railway station here refer to any railway station which is categorized by the Indian railways by commercial importance as between NSG-1 to NSG-4 or between SG-1 to SG-2 grade) are listed.

Non-Suburban Grade (NSG)
Category	Number of Stations	Major railway stations (Note: Major railway station here refer to any railway station which is categorized by the Indian railways by commercial importance as between NSG-1 to NSG-4 or between SG-1 to SG-2 grade)
NSG-1	1	Sealdah
NSG-2	2	Kolkata, Naihati Junction
NSG-3	1	Berhampore Court
NSG-4	2	Beldanga, Murshidabad Junction
NSG-5	10	
NSG-6	9	
Suburban Grade (SG)
SG-1	0	–
SG-2	16	Barasat Junction, Barrackpore, Baruipur Junction, Belgharia, Bidhannagar Road, Chakdaha, Dum Dum Junction, Habra, Khardaha, Krishnanagar City Junction, Madhyamgram, Ranaghat Junction, Shyamnagar, Sodpur, Sonarpur Junction, Ichhapur,Subhasgram
SG-3	112	
Halt Grade (HG)
HG-1	0	
HG-2	0	
HG-3	53	
