= Eastern Bengal Railway =

Railway company in British India

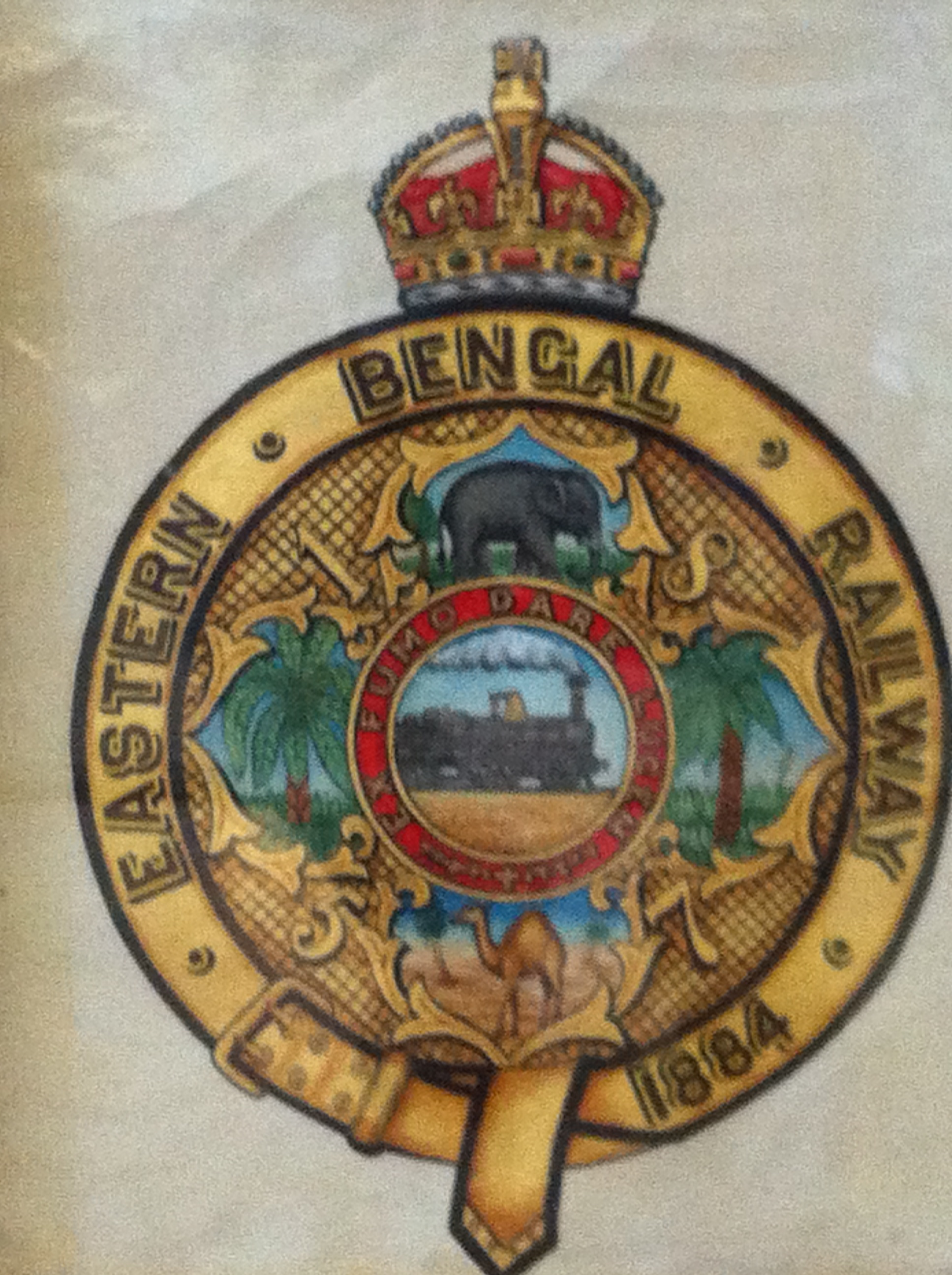
- Industry: Railways
- Founded: 1857
- Defunct: 1942
- Headquarters: Calcutta, British India
- Area served: Bengal and Assam
- Services: Rail transport

The Eastern Bengal Railway (full name: "Eastern Bengal Railway Company"; shortened EBR) was one of the pioneering railway companies that operated from 1857 to 1942, in the Bengal and Assam provinces of British India (now part of Bangladesh Railway, and Northeast Frontier Railway and Eastern Railway of India).

== History ==
=== Formation ===
Eastern Bengal Railway Act 1857 (Note: Section 1.)
- Act of Parliament
- Parliament of the United Kingdom
- Long title: An Act for incorporating the Eastern Bengal Railway Company, and for other purposes.
- Citation: 20 & 21 Vict. c. clix
- Territorial extent: United Kingdom

Dates
- Royal assent: 25 August 1857
- Commencement: 25 August 1857 (Note: The Acts of Parliament (Commencement) Act 1793.)
- Repealed: 31 January 2013

Other legislation
- Repealed by: Statute Law (Repeals) Act 2013

Status: Repealed

Text of statute as originally enacted

The Eastern Bengal Railway Company was incorporated by the Eastern Bengal Railway Act 1857 (20 & 21 Vict. c. clix) of the Parliament of the United Kingdom, with the objective of introduction of railway transport in eastern Bengal and even to move into Burma. The operational area of Eastern Bengal Railway was to be the east bank of the Hooghly River, while East Indian Railway Company operated on the west bank of the river.

=== Rolling stock ===
By the end of 1877 the company owned 43 steam locomotives, 180 coaches and 691 goods wagons. By 1936, the rolling stock had increased to 327 locomotives, 3 steam railcars, 1560 coaches and 13.781 freight wagons.

=== Classification ===
It was labeled as a Class I railway according to the Indian Railway Classification System of 1926.

=== Subsequent developments ===
Eastern Bengal Railway Company Purchase Act 1884
- Act of Parliament
- Parliament of the United Kingdom
- Long title: An Act to provide for the vesting of the undertaking of the Eastern Bengal Railway Company in the Secretary of State in Council of India and for other purposes.
- Citation: 47 & 48 Vict. c. cciv
- Territorial extent: United Kingdom

Dates
- Royal assent: 28 July 1884
- Commencement: 28 July 1884
- Repealed: 31 January 2013

Other legislation
- Repealed by: Statute Law (Repeals) Act 2013

Status: Repealed

Text of statute as originally enacted

The EBR was taken over by the Government of India by the Eastern Bengal Railway Company Purchase Act 1884 (47 & 48 Vict. c. cciv) and renamed the Eastern Bengal State Railway.

The Calcutta and South-Eastern Railway (CSER) was formed in 1859 to connect Calcutta with Port Canning on the Matla River. It constructed and completed the 45 km (28 mi) long line on 15 May 1863. The Calcutta and South-Eastern Railway was merged into the Eastern Bengal State Railway in 1887.

In 1915, it reverted to its old name Eastern Bengal Railway. In 1941, the Bengal Dooars Railway was merged into Eastern Bengal Railway. In 1942, the Government of India merged Assam Bengal Railway with Eastern Bengal Railway to create Bengal and Assam Railway.

Railways in British India
"As a child of its era, the railway left an indelible mark on the 19th century developments in India. In a country of continental distances, it provided the foundation for modern economic expansion by facilitating the carriage of huge quantities of passengers and freight over very long distances at hitherto unparalleled speeds. During the early part of 20th century, in a growing economy with rapid increase in demand for mobility, railway development was sparked off at a pace similar if not more marked than in Western countries in the 19th century. Development and rapid expansion of railway network in British India served as the backbone for economic growth and industrial development in the post independence era."

=== Successors ===
After the partition of India in 1947 the broad-gauge portion of the Bengal and Assam Railway, lying in India was added to the East Indian Railway and the metre-gauge portion became the Assam Railway.

On 14 April 1952, the Assam Railway and the Oudh and Tirhut Railway were amalgamated to form the North Eastern Railway. On the same day, the reorganized Sealdah division of the erstwhile Bengal Assam Railway (which was added to the East Indian Railway earlier) was amalgamated with the Eastern Railway.

With the formation of the Northeast Frontier Railway on 15 January 1958, the portions of the erstwhile Eastern Bengal Railway that were in Assam and the Indian portion of North Bengal, came under its jurisdiction.

The portion of the system which fell within the boundary of erstwhile East Pakistan was named as Eastern Bengal Railway. On 1 February 1961, the Eastern Bengal Railway was renamed as the Pakistan Railway and in 1962 it became the Pakistan Eastern Railway. With the emergence of Bangladesh, it became the Bangladesh Railway.

== Lines ==
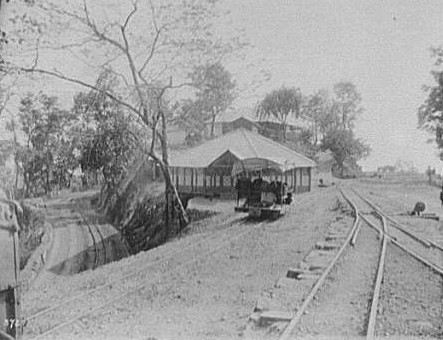
A switchback station loop on the East Bengal Railway, 1895. Photo by William Henry Jackson.

The first line of Eastern Bengal Railway was constructed from Sealdah (Calcutta) to Kushtia (now in Bangladesh) in 1862 (presently covered by Sealdah–Ranaghat–Gede line of West Bengal and Chilahati–Parbatipur–Santahar–Darshana line of Bangladesh). It was decided in 1865 to extend the line to Goalundo Ghat (now in Bangladesh). The extension opened on 31 December 1870. By 1902, it was extended north to as far as Dhubri (now in Assam).

The Eastern Bengal Railway, which operated east of the Hooghly River, was linked with the East Indian Railway, which operated west of the river, when Jubilee Bridge, linking Bandel of East Indian Railway and Naihati of Eastern Bengal Railway, was opened in 1887. The Calcutta Chord Railway constructed the line from Dum Dum of Eastern Bengal Railway to Dankuni of East Indian Railway over the Willingdon Bridge in 1932. The bridge was later renamed Vivekananda Setu.

== Hindrance to free flow of water ==
In many parts of riverine eastern Bengal, with long stretches of low lands, the railways had to be built on embankments which hindered the free flow of water. In a brief case study of Eastern Bengal Railway it has been revealed that the water regime of the Rajshahi Division of present Bangladesh was destabilized by the way the railway exposed itself to the Chalan Beel. From the beginning of the twentieth century the beel (pond or wetland) began to be bounded by the Calcutta–Siliguri main line on the west and by the Santahar–Bogra line on the north. These lines affected the feeding of the beel. Its drainage was affected by the Sirajganj branch line in the south-east.

== Conversion to broad gauge ==
The Indian part of EBR was converted to 1,676 mm (5 ft 6 in) broad gauge in 1990s to 2010s. The Bangladesh part is under conversion to 1,676 mm (5 ft 6 in) broad gauge.

== See also ==
- Eastern Railway FC
- Indian Railway
