= Taldi =

- Census Town
- Location in West Bengal Location in India
- Coordinates: 22.3414°N 88.6065°E
- Country: India
- State: West Bengal
- District: South 24 Parganas
- CD block: Canning I

Area
  - Total: 3.47 km^{2} (1.34 sq mi)
- Elevation: 6 m (20 ft)

Population (2011)
  - Total: 12,459
  - Density: 3,590/km^{2} (9,300/sq mi)

Languages
  - Official: Bengali
  - Additional official: English
- Time zone: UTC+5:30 (IST)
- PIN: 743376
- Telephone code: +91 3218
- Vehicle registration: WB-19 to WB-22, WB-95 to WB-99
- Lok Sabha constituency: Jaynagar (SC)
- Vidhan Sabha constituency: Canning Paschim (SC)
- Website: www.s24pgs.gov.in

Taldi is a census town and a gram panchayat in the Canning I CD block in the Canning subdivision of the South 24 Parganas district in the Indian state of West Bengal.

== Geography ==
Places in Canning subdivision (Canning I & II, Basanti, Gosaba CD blocks) in South 24 Parganas district
R: rural/ urban centre
Places linked with coastal activity are marked in blue
Owing to space constraints in the small map, the actual locations in a larger map may vary slightly

=== Area overview ===
Canning subdivision has a very low level of urbanization. Only 12.37% of the population lives in the urban areas and 87.63% lives in the rural areas. There are 8 census towns in the Canning I CD block and only 2 in the rest of the subdivision. The entire district is situated in the Ganges Delta with numerous islands in the southern part of the region. The area (shown in the map alongside) borders on the Sundarbans National Park and a major portion of it is a part of the Sundarbans settlements. It is a flat low-lying area in the South Bidyadhari plains. The Matla River is prominent and there are many streams and water channels locally known as khals. A comparatively recent country-wide development is the guarding of the coastal areas with a special coastal force.

Note: The map alongside presents some of the notable locations in the subdivision. All places marked in the map are linked in the larger full screen map.

=== Location ===
Taldi is located at 22.3414°N 88.6065°E

Rajapur, Taldi, Bayarsingh, Matla and Dighirpar form a cluster of census towns in the Canning I CD block, as per the map of the Canning I CD block on page 333 of the District Census Handbook 2011. Canning is not identified as a separate place in the 2011 census records. The map of the CD block Canning I in the District Census Handbook for the South 24 Parganas shows Canning as being a part of Matla and Dighirpar census towns.

== Demographics ==
According to the 2011 Census of India, Taldi had a total population of 12,459, of which 6,285 (50%) were males and 6,174 (49%) were females. There were 1,461 persons in the age range of 0 to 6 years. The total number of literate persons in Taldi was 8,399 (76.37% of the population over 6 years).

== Infrastructure ==
According to the District Census Handbook 2011, Taldi covered an area of 3.4735 km^{2}. Among the civic amenities, it has 54 km roads with open drains, the protected water supply involved pressure tank and service reservoir. It had 1,540 domestic electric connections and 85 road light points. Among the medical facilities it had 2 dispensaries/ health centres and 3 medicine shops. Among the educational facilities it had were 5 primary schools, 2 middle schools, 2 secondary schools and 2 senior secondary schools. It had 2 non-formal education centres (Sarba Siksha Abhiyan). Among the social, cultural and recreational facilities, it had 1 public library and 1 reading room. It had branches of 1 nationalised bank, 1 cooperative bank and 1 agricultural credit society.

== Transport ==
Baruipur-Canning Road links Taldi to the State Highway 1.

Taldi railway station is on the Sealdah–Canning line of the Kolkata Suburban Railway system.

=== Commuters ===
With the electrification of the railways, suburban traffic has grown tremendously since the 1960s. As of 2005-06, more than 1.7 million (17 lakhs) commuters use the Kolkata Suburban Railway system daily. After the partition of India, refugees from East Pakistan/ Bangladesh had a strong impact on the development of urban areas in the periphery of Kolkata. The new immigrants depended on Kolkata for their livelihood, thus increasing the number of commuters. Eastern Railway runs 1,272 EMU trains daily.

== Education ==
Bankim Sardar College was established at Tangrakhali in 1955.

Jibantala Rokeya Mahavidyalaya was established at Jibantala in 1985.

Taldi Mohan Chand High School was established in 1949. It has facilities for teaching from class VI to XII.

Taldi Surabala Sikshayatan for girls is a higher secondary school.

Bahirsona Junior High School is a Bengali-medium coeducational institution established in 2010. It has facilities for teaching from class V to class VIII.

== Healthcare ==
Gourdaha Block Primary Health Centre at Ghutiari Sharif, with 100 beds, is the major government medical facility in the Canning I CD block.
