= Makhal Tala =

- Census Town
- Location in West Bengal Location in India
- Coordinates: 22.3785°N 88.5542°E
- Country: India
- State: West Bengal
- District: South 24 Parganas
- CD block: Canning II

Area
  - Total: 2.68 km^{2} (1.03 sq mi)
- Elevation: 6 m (20 ft)

Population (2011)
  - Total: 11,192
  - Density: 4,180/km^{2} (10,800/sq mi)

Languages
  - Official: Bengali
  - Additional official: English
- Time zone: UTC+5:30 (IST)
- PIN: 743363
- Telephone code: +91 3218
- Vehicle registration: WB-19 to WB-22, WB-95 to WB-99
- Lok Sabha constituency: Jaynagar (SC)
- Vidhan Sabha constituency: Canning Paschim (SC)
- Website: www.s24pgs.gov.in

Makhal Tala is a census town within the jurisdiction of the Jibantala police station in the Canning II CD block in the Canning subdivision of the South 24 Parganas district in the Indian state of West Bengal.

== Geography ==
Places in Canning subdivision (Canning I & II, Basanti, Gosaba CD blocks) in South 24 Parganas district
R: rural/ urban centre
Places linked with coastal activity are marked in blue
Owing to space constraints in the small map, the actual locations in a larger map may vary slightly

=== Area overview ===
Canning subdivision has a very low level of urbanization. Only 12.37% of the population lives in the urban areas and 87.63% lives in the rural areas. There are 8 census towns in the Canning I CD block and only 2 in the rest of the subdivision. The entire district is situated in the Ganges Delta with numerous islands in the southern part of the region. The area (shown in the map alongside) borders on the Sundarbans National Park and a major portion of it is a part of the Sundarbans settlements. It is a flat low-lying area in the South Bidyadhari plains. The Matla River is prominent and there are many streams and water channels locally known as khals. A comparatively recent country-wide development is the guarding of the coastal areas with a special coastal force.

Note: The map alongside presents some of the notable locations in the subdivision. All places marked in the map are linked in the larger full screen map.

=== Location ===
Makhaltala ct is located at 22.2222°N 88.3316°E

== Demographics ==
According to the 2011 Census of India, Makhal Tala had a total population of 11,192, of which 5,651 (50%) were males and 5,541 (50%) were females. There were 1,799 persons in the age range of 0 to 6 years. The total number of literate persons in Makhal Tala was 5,660 (60.25% of the population over 6 years).

== Infrastructure ==
According to the District Census Handbook 2011, Makhal Tala covered an area of 2.6771 km^{2}. Among the civic amenities, the protected water supply involved overhead tank and service reservoir. It had 979 domestic electric connections. Among the medical facilities it had were a nursing home 2 km away, and in the town it had 2 charitable hospitals/ nursing homes and 10 medicine shops. Among the educational facilities it had were 2 primary schools, 1 middle school, 1 secondary school, 1 senior secondary school, the nearest general degree college at Tangrakhali 22 km away. It had 1 recognised shorthand, typewriting and vocational training institution.

== Transport ==
Makhal Tala is on the Chakberia-Ghutiari Sharif Road.

Ghutiari Sharif railway station is located nearby.

== Healthcare ==
Matherdighi Rural Hospital, with 30 beds, at Matherdighi, is the major government medical facility in the Canning II CD block.
