= Hero Bhanga =

- Village
- Location in West Bengal Location in India
- Coordinates: 22.2265°N 88.6097°E
- Country: India
- State: West Bengal
- District: South 24 Parganas
- CD Block: Canning I

Area
  - Total: 6.01 km^{2} (2.32 sq mi)
- Elevation: 6 m (20 ft)

Population (2011)
  - Total: 7,339
  - Density: 1,220/km^{2} (3,160/sq mi)

Languages
  - Official: Bengali
  - Additional official: English
- Time zone: UTC+5:30 (IST)
- PIN: 743329
- Telephone code: +91 3218
- Vehicle registration: WB-19 to WB-22, WB-95 to WB-99
- Lok Sabha constituency: Jaynagar (SC)
- Vidhan Sabha constituency: Canning Paschim (SC)
- Website: www.s24pgs.gov.in

Hero Bhanga is a village within the jurisdiction of the Canning police station located in the Canning I CD block in the Canning subdivision of the South 24 Parganas district, Indian state, West Bengal.

== Geography ==
Hero Bhanga is located at 22°13′35″N 88°36′35″E. It has an average elevation of 6 metres (20 ft).

== Demographics ==
As per 2011 Census of India, Hero Bhanga had a total population of 7,339.

== Transport ==
A stretch of a local road links Hero Bhanga to the Baruipur-Canning Road.

Canning railway station is located nearby.

== Healthcare ==
Ghutiari Sharif Block Primary Health Centre at Ghutiari Sharif, with 10 beds, is the major government medical facility in the Canning I CD block.
