= 2013 Canning riots =

Anti-Hindu riots in West Bengal, India

The 2013 Canning riots were anti-Hindu riots in state of West Bengal on 21 February 2013. The riots occurred in the Canning subdivision, after a Muslim cleric was stopped and killed by half dozen unidentified assailants near Nalekhali. Following this incident, more than 200 homes were burned down in the villages of Naliakhali, Herobhanga, Gopalpur, and Goladogra in the Canning police station area. Several shops were looted in Jaynagar Majilpur police station area under Baruipur subdivision. Incidents of violence were reported from Canning, Jaynagar Majilpur, Kultali and Basanti police station areas.

== Background ==
On 19 February 2013, shortly after midnight, Indian Standard Time, a Muslim imam from Ghutiari Sharif in Canning subdivision was returning from a religious congregation at Jamtala in Jaynagar, in a motorcycle along with a colleague. When they reached Naliakhali around 2 a.m., they were intercepted by a gang who robbed the cleric and shot him. According to police sources, the cleric was reportedly carrying ₹ 1,150,000 in cash that was looted by the unidentified gunmen.

The altercation resulted in the death of the imam, although his companion managed to flee after sustaining injuries. At dawn, the driver of the first bus from Golabari to Canning discovered the body and intimated the Canning police station. Several other bus drivers travelling on that route communicated their findings to the police station. The police initially took the incident casually and made no effort to visit Naliakhali. Police were unable able to trace the culprits or even the motive behind the murder. The murder of a Muslim cleric with a large following in the same district emotionally charged the locals.

== Violence ==
Naliakhali is a Hindu majority village in the Gopalpur panchayat that fell under the executive jurisdiction of the Canning police station.

A crowd gathered at the site of the attack and rumors began to spread that the killers were from the village of Naliakhali. Thousands of people from neighbouring areas, such as Canning, Jibantala, Sarengabad, Jhorormore, Narayanpur, and Dhoaghata gathered on the site and refused to part with the body of cleric. When police tried to take away the body of the cleric for processing, the mob attacked the police with brickbats. Anup Kumar Ghosh, the sub-inspector of the police station at Canning, was injured and was admitted to the Canning Sub-divisional Hospital. Seven policemen were injured in the attack. The mob also attacked and damaged police vehicles.

In the meantime, neighbors of the dead imam were transported to Canning from Kolkata in lorries. A local school principal reportedly incited the mob into violence. At around 10 a.m., a heavily armed mob of at least 10,000 began an attack upon Naliakhali. They ransacked and looted the homes of Bengali Hindus as the residents fled for their lives. Rioters hurled bombs, doused the houses with petrol and set them on fire. Violence and arson spread to nearby locations such as Dhopar More and Bangalpara. Hindu homes and places of business were ransacked in Gopalpur, Goladogra, and Herobhanga. The crowd blocked the road at Bhangankhali, Priyor More, Hospital More, and Natunhat. Protesters staged a rail blockage at Ghutiari Sharif station in the Sonarpur-Canning section of the Sealdah South lines.

At around 11 a.m., the South 24 Parganas District Superintendent of Police Praveen Kumar Tripathi, reached the spot along with a massive riot squad and Rapid Action Force battalions. They resorted to a lathi charge in order to pacify and disperse the mob. The body of the imam was then sent for an autopsy. In the late afternoon reinforcements from the Bidhannagar Police Commissionerate and the Howrah Police Commissionerate reached with water cannons to douse the flames of the burning village. The police evoked Section-144 of the Code of Criminal Procedure and established a curfew in the area.

== Aftermath ==
More than 200 houses were burnt in several villages that came under the jurisdictions of the Canning, Jaynagar, Kultali and Basanti police stations, displacing more than 2,000 people. Some of the displaced people took shelter in makeshift relief camps while others had to live on the road. The state government announced a compensation of ₹ 300,000 to the family of the murdered cleric and ₹ 10,000 to each of the 93 families displaced by the violence. 52 people were arrested by the police in connection with the violence. Some NGOs have provided food and medicine to the affected region in Naliakhali.

West Bengal Minister of State for Minority Affairs and Trinamool Congress MLA. from Magrahat West constituency Giasuddin Molla accused the Communist Party of India and Indian National Congress of fomenting trouble in the state before the panchayat elections. The Chief Minister Mamata Banerjee has appealed for peace and promised a special investigation into the murder case. Political observers have linked the violence to the forthcoming panchayat elections in the region, where the Trinamool Congress and the Communist Party of India were trying to woo Muslim voters in the district.

== See also ==
- 2010 Deganga riots
