= Dighirpar =

- Census Town
- Location in West Bengal Location in India
- Coordinates: 22.3034°N 88.6678°E
- Country: India
- State: West Bengal
- District: South 24 Parganas
- CD block: Canning I

Area
  - Total: 2.77 km^{2} (1.07 sq mi)
- Elevation: 6 m (20 ft)

Population (2011)
  - Total: 15,881
  - Density: 5,730/km^{2} (14,800/sq mi)

Languages
  - Official: Bengali
  - Additional official: English
- Time zone: UTC+5:30 (IST)
- PIN: 743329
- Telephone code: +91 3218
- Vehicle registration: WB-19 to WB-22, WB-95 to WB-99
- Lok Sabha constituency: Jaynagar (SC)
- Vidhan Sabha constituency: Canning Paschim (SC)
- Website: www.s24pgs.gov.in

Dighirpar is a census town and a gram panchayat within the jurisdiction of the Canning police station in the Canning I CD block in the Canning subdivision of the South 24 Parganas district in the Indian state of West Bengal.

== Geography ==
Places in Canning subdivision (Canning I & II, Basanti, Gosaba CD blocks) in South 24 Parganas district
R: rural/ urban centre
Places linked with coastal activity are marked in blue
Owing to space constraints in the small map, the actual locations in a larger map may vary slightly

=== Area overview ===
Canning subdivision has a very low level of urbanization. Only 12.37% of the population lives in the urban areas and 87.63% lives in the rural areas. There are 8 census towns in Canning I CD block and only 2 in the rest of the subdivision. The entire district is situated in the Ganges Delta with numerous islands in the southern part of the region. The area (shown in the map alongside) borders on the Sundarbans National Park and a major portion of it is a part of the Sundarbans settlements. It is a flat low-lying area in the South Bidyadhari plains. The Matla River is prominent and there are many streams and water channels locally known as khals. A comparatively recent country-wide development is the guarding of the coastal areas with a special coastal force.

Note: The map alongside presents some of the notable locations in the subdivision. All places marked in the map are linked in the larger full screen map.

=== Location ===
Dighirpar is located at 22.3034°N 88.6678°E

Rajapur, Taldi, Bayarsingh, Matla and Dighirpar form a cluster of census towns in Canning I CD block, as per the map of the Canning I CD block on page 333 of the District Census Handbook 2011. Canning is not identified as a separate place in the 2011 census records. The map of CD block Canning I in the District Census Handbook for the South 24 Parganas shows Canning as being a part of Matla and Dighirpar census towns.

== Demographics ==
According to the 2011 Census of India, Dighirpar had a total population of 15,881, of which 8,106 (51%) were males and 7,775 (49%) were females. There were 1,509 persons in the age range of 0 to 6 years. The total number of literate persons in Dighirpar was 11,453 (86.65% of the population over 6 years).

== Infrastructure ==
According to the District Census Handbook 2011, Dighirpar covered an area of 2.7742 km^{2}. Among the civic amenities, it had 3 km roads with open drain, the protected water supply involved overhead tank and service reservoir. It had 1,524 domestic electric connections. Among the medical facilities it had were 2 dispensaries/ health centres, 1 nursing home and 6 medicine shops. Among the educational facilities it had were 10 primary schools, 2 middle school, 1 secondary school.

== Transport ==
Baruipur-Canning Road links Dighirpar to the State Highway 1

Canning railway station is located nearby.

== Education ==
De Paul School is a Bengali-medium coeducational school at Dighirpar. It was established in 2008 and has facilities for teaching from class I to class VIII.

== Healthcare ==
Ghutiari Sharif Block Primary Health Centre at Ghutiari Sharif, with 10 beds, is the major government medical facility in the Canning I CD block.
