= Netra, Canning =

Netra
- Village
- Location in West Bengal Location in India
- Coordinates: 22.4324°N 88.6362°E
- Country: India
- State: West Bengal
- District: South 24 Parganas
- CD Block: Canning II

Area
  - Total: 4.09 km^{2} (1.58 sq mi)
- Elevation: 6 m (20 ft)

Population (2011)
  - Total: 4,154
  - Density: 1,020/km^{2} (2,630/sq mi)

Languages
  - Official: Bengali
  - Additional official: English
- Time zone: UTC+5:30 (IST)
- PIN: 743502
- Telephone code: +91 3218
- Vehicle registration: WB-19 to WB-22, WB-95 to WB-99
- Lok Sabha constituency: Jaynagar (SC)
- Vidhan Sabha constituency: Canning Purba
- Website: www.s24pgs.gov.in

Netra is a village within the jurisdiction of the Jibantala police station in the Canning II CD block in the Canning subdivision of the South 24 Parganas district in the Indian state of West Bengal.

== Geography ==
Netra is located at 22°25′57″N 88°38′10″E. It has an average elevation of 6 metres (20 ft).

== Demographics ==
As per 2011 Census of India, Netra had a total population of 4,154.

== Transport ==
Netra is on the Bodra-Jibantala Road.

== Healthcare ==
Matherdighi Rural Hospital, with 30 beds, at Matherdighi, is the major government medical facility in the Canning II CD block.
