= Deuli =

Deuli may refer to:

- Deuli, Bangladesh
- Deuli, India
- Deuli, Canning, census town in South 24 Parganas district, West Bengal, India
