= Matla (disambiguation) =

The matla' is the first couplet of a ghazal.

Matla may also refer to:

- Matla River, a river in West Bengal, India
- Matla, Canning, a census town in South 24 Parganas district, West Bengal, India
