= Matla, Canning =

Matla
- Census Town
- Location in West Bengal Location in India
- Coordinates: 22.3234°N 88.6478°E
- Country: India
- State: West Bengal
- District: South 24 Parganas
- CD block: Canning I

Area
  - Total: 10.20 km^{2} (3.94 sq mi)
- Elevation: 6 m (20 ft)

Population (2011)
  - Total: 31,920
  - Density: 3,129/km^{2} (8,105/sq mi)

Languages
  - Official: Bengali
  - Additional official: English
- Time zone: UTC+5:30 (IST)
- PIN: 743376
- Telephone code: +91 3218
- Vehicle registration: WB-19 to WB-22, WB-95 to WB-99
- Lok Sabha constituency: Jaynagar (SC)
- Vidhan Sabha constituency: Canning Paschim (SC)
- Website: www.s24pgs.gov.in

Matla is a census town and a gram panchayat within the jurisdiction of the Canning police station in the Canning I CD block in the Canning subdivision of the South 24 Parganas district in the Indian state of West Bengal.

== Geography ==
Places in Canning subdivision (Canning I & II, Basanti, Gosaba CD blocks) in South 24 Parganas district
R: rural/ urban centre
Places linked with coastal activity are marked in blue
Owing to space constraints in the small map, the actual locations in a larger map may vary slightly

=== Area overview ===
Canning subdivision has a very low level of urbanization. Only 12.37% of the population lives in the urban areas and 87.63% lives in the rural areas. There are 8 census towns in Canning I CD block and only 2 in the rest of the subdivision. The entire district is situated in the Ganges Delta with numerous islands in the southern part of the region. The area (shown in the map alongside) borders on the Sundarbans National Park and a major portion of it is a part of the Sundarbans settlements. It is a flat low-lying area in the South Bidyadhari plains. The Matla River is prominent and there are many streams and water channels locally known as khals. A comparatively recent country-wide development is the guarding of the coastal areas with special coastal force.

Note: The map alongside presents some of the notable locations in the subdivision. All places marked in the map are linked in the larger full screen map.

=== Location ===
Matla is located at 22.3234°N 88.6478°E

Rajapur, Taldi, Bayarsingh, Matla and Dighirpar form a cluster of census towns in the Canning I CD block, as per the map of the Canning I CD block on page 333 of the District Census Handbook 2011. Canning is not identified as a separate place in the 2011 census records. The map of CD block Canning I in the District Census Handbook for the South 24 Parganas shows Canning as being a part of Matla and Dighirpar census towns.

== Demographics ==
According to the 2011 Census of India, Matla had a total population of 31,920, of which 16,248 (51%) were males and 15,672 (49%) were females. There were 3,564 persons in the age range of 0 to 6 years. The total number of literate persons in Matla was 22,118 (78.00% of the population over 6 years).

== Infrastructure ==
According to the District Census Handbook 2011, Matla covered an area of 10.2017 km^{2}. Among the civic amenities, the protected water supply involved overhead tank and service reservoir. It had 4,220 domestic electric connections and 584 road light points. Among the medical facilities it had 1 hospital. Among the educational facilities It had were 10 primary schools, 1 middle school, 2 secondary schools, 1 senior secondary school, the nearest general degree college was at Tangrakhali 10 km away. It had 1 recognised shorthand, typewriting and vocational institution. Among the social, recreational and cultural facilities, it had 1 orphanage, 1 cinema theatre and 4 libraries. Three important commodities it produced were: bakery products, batik print and mustard oil. It had branches of nationalised banks, 1 cooperative bank, 1 agricultural credit society and 1 non-agricultural credit society.

== Transport ==
Baruipur-Canning Road links Matla to the State Highway 1.

Matla Halt railway station is on the Sealdah–Canning line of the Kolkata Suburban Railway system.

=== Commuters ===
With the electrification of the railways, suburban traffic has grown tremendously since the 1960s. As of 2005-06, more than 1.7 million (17 lakhs) commuters use the Kolkata Suburban Railway system daily. After the partition of India, refugees from East Pakistan/ Bangladesh had a strong impact on the development of urban areas in the periphery of Kolkata. The new immigrants depended on Kolkata for their livelihood, thus increasing the number of commuters. Eastern Railway runs 1,272 EMU trains daily.

== Education ==
Bankim Sardar College was established at Tangrakhali in 1955.

== Healthcare ==
Ghutiari Sharif Block Primary Health Centre at Ghutiari Sharif, with 10 beds, is the major government medical facility in the Canning I CD block.
