= Paresh Ram Das =

Indian politician

Member of the West Bengal Legislative Assembly
- Incumbent
- Assumed office 2 May 2021
- Preceded by: Shyamal Mondal
- Constituency: Canning Paschim

Personal details
- Party: AITC
- Profession: Politician

Paresh Ram Das is an Indian politician member of All India Trinamool Congress. He is an MLA, elected from the Canning Paschim constituency in the 2021 West Bengal Legislative Assembly election.
