= Taldi railway station =

Railway station in West Bengal, India

Taldi
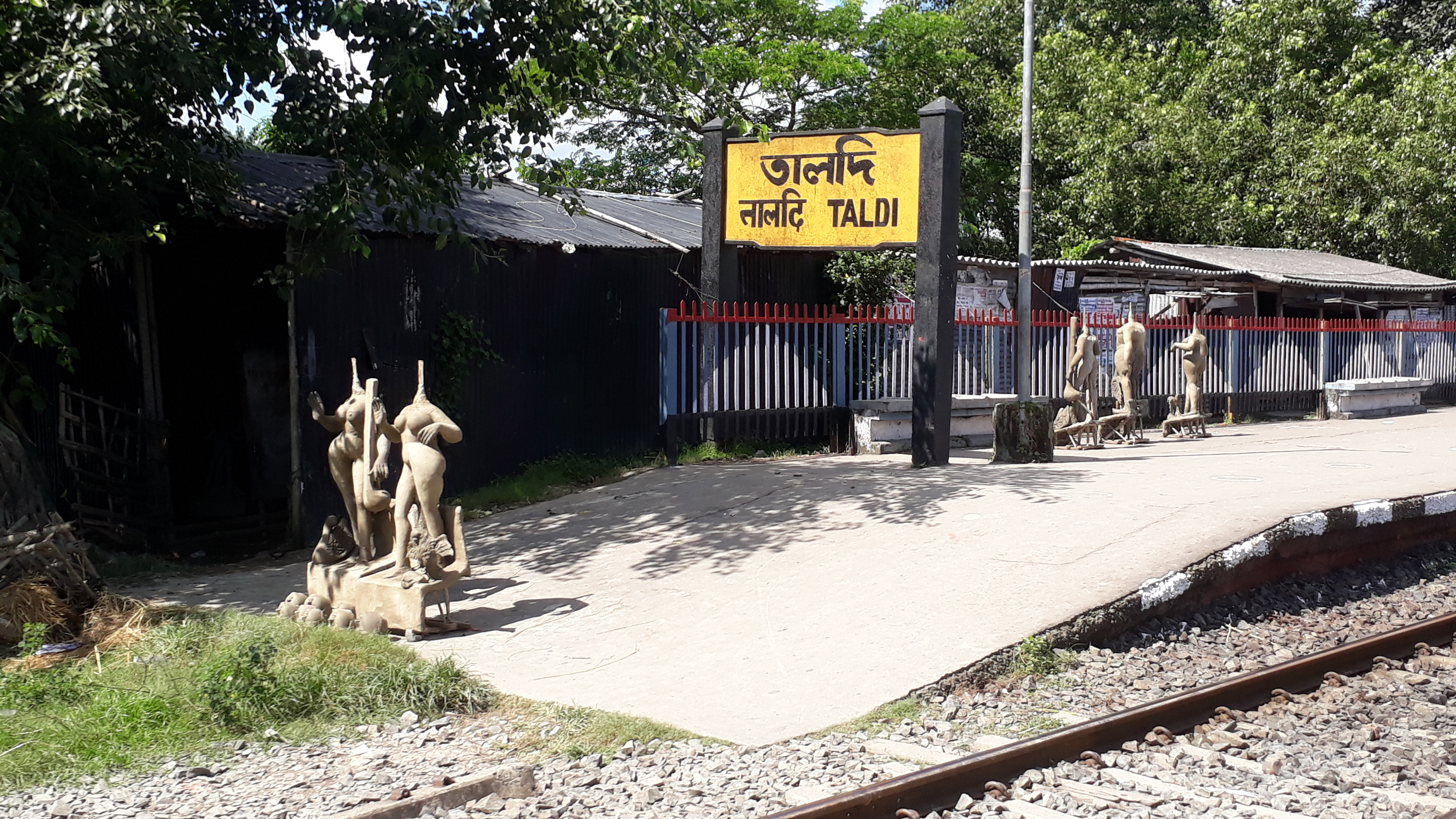

General information
- Location: Rajapur, Taldi, Canning I, South 24 Parganas, West Bengal; India
- Coordinates: 22.343388°N 88.609154°E
- Elevation: 6 metres (20 ft)
- System: Kolkata Suburban Railway Station
- Owner: Indian Railways
- Operator: Eastern Railway
- Line: Canning Branch line
- Platforms: 2
- Tracks: 2

Construction
- Structure type: Standard (on-ground station)
- Parking: Not Available
- Cycle facilities: Not Available
- Accessible: Not Available

Other information
- Status: Functioning
- Station code: TLX
- Zone(s): Eastern Railway
- Division(s): Sealdah

History
- Opened: 1862; 164 years ago
- Electrified: 1965–66
- Former names: Eastern Bengal Railway
Services
Preceding station	Kolkata Suburban Railway	Following station
Matla Halt towards Canning	Sealdah South Canning Branch line	Betberia Ghola towards Sealdah
Route map
Location

Taldi railway station is a Kolkata Suburban Railway Station on the Canning Branch line. It is under the jurisdiction of the Sealdah railway division in the Eastern Railway zone of the Indian Railways. Taldi railway station is situated at Rajapur, Taldi in South 24 Parganas district in the Indian state of West Bengal.

== History ==
In 1862, the Eastern Bengal Railway constructed a 1,676 mm (5 ft 6 in)-wide broad-gauge railway from Sonarpur Junction to Canning via Taldi.

== Electrification ==
Electrification from Sonarpur Junction to Canning including Taldi was completed with 25 kV AC overhead system in 1965–66.

== Station complex ==
The platform is very much well sheltered. The station possesses many facilities including water and sanitation. There is a proper approach road to this station.
