= Tengra Khali =

- Village
- Location in West Bengal Location in India
- Coordinates: 22.3094°N 88.6219°E
- Country: India
- State: West Bengal
- District: South 24 Parganas
- CD block: Canning I

Area
  - Total: 1.08 km^{2} (0.42 sq mi)
- Elevation: 6 m (20 ft)

Population (2011)
  - Total: 1,221
  - Density: 1,130/km^{2} (2,930/sq mi)

Languages
  - Official: Bengali
  - Additional official: English
- Time zone: UTC+5:30 (IST)
- PIN: 743329
- Telephone code: +91 3218
- Vehicle registration: WB-19 to WB-22, WB-95 to WB-99
- Lok Sabha constituency: Jaynagar (SC)
- Vidhan Sabha constituency: Canning Paschim (SC)
- Website: www.s24pgs.gov.in

Tengra Khali is a village within the jurisdiction of the Canning police station in the Canning I CD block in the Canning subdivision of the South 24 Parganas district in the Indian state of West Bengal.

== Geography ==
Places in Canning subdivision (Canning I & II, Basanti, Gosaba CD blocks) in South 24 Parganas district
R: rural/ urban centre
Places linked with coastal activity are marked in blue
Owing to space constraints in the small map, the actual locations in a larger map may vary slightly

=== Area overview ===
Canning subdivision has a very low level of urbanization. Only 12.37% of the population lives in the urban areas and 87.63% lives in the rural areas. There are 8 census towns in the Canning I CD block and only 2 in the rest of the subdivision. The entire district is situated in the Ganges Delta with numerous islands in the southern part of the region. The area (shown in the map alongside) borders on the Sundarbans National Park and a major portion of it is a part of the Sundarbans settlements. It is a flat low-lying area in the South Bidyadhari plains. The Matla River is prominent and there are many streams and water channels locally known as khals. A comparatively recent country-wide development is the guarding of the coastal areas with a special coastal force.

Note: The map alongside presents some of the notable locations in the subdivision. All places marked in the map are linked in the larger full screen map.

=== Location ===
Tengra Khali is located at 22.3094°N 88.6219°E

== Demographics ==
According to the 2011 Census of India, Tengra Khali had a total population of 1, 221 of which 641 (52%) were males and 580 (48%) were females. There were 110 persons in the age range of 0 to 6 years. The total number of literate persons in Tengra Khali was 839 (75.52% of the population over 6 years).

== Transport ==
Baruipur-Canning Road links Tengra Khali to the State Highway 1.

Canning railway station is located nearby.

== Education ==
Bankim Sardar College, established in 1955, is affiliated with the University of Calcutta. It offers honours courses in English, Bengali, Sanskrit, history, political science, education, physics, botany, zoology, B.Com. Hons., general courses in arts, science, commerce and post graduation in Bengali.

Tengra Khali PJP School is a Bengali-medium coeducational institution established in 1949.

== Healthcare ==
Ghutiari Sharif Block Primary Health Centre at Ghutiari Sharif, with 10 beds, is the major government medical facility in the Canning I CD block.
