= Shyamal Mondal =

Indian politician

Minister of State for Sunderban Affairs (Independent Charge)
- In office 20 May 2011 – November 2012
- Governor: M. K. Narayanan

Minister of State for Irrigation and Waterways
- In office 20 May 2011 – November 2012

MLA
- In office 13 May 2011 – 2021
- Constituency: Canning Paschim

Personal details
- Party: All India Trinamool Congress

Shyamal Mondal is an Indian politician and a former Minister of State for Sunderban Affairs (Independent Charge) and the Minister of State for Irrigation and Waterways in the Government of West Bengal. He is also an MLA, elected from the Canning Paschim constituency in the 2011 West Bengal state assembly election.

He was dropped from the ministry in a reshuffle in November 2012.
