= Canning I =

Community Development Block in West Bengal, India

- Community Development Block
- Location of Canning I community development block in South 24 Parganas district
- Coordinates: 22.3139917°N 88.6650753°E
- Country: India
- State: West Bengal
- Division: Presidency
- District: South 24 Parganas
- Subdivision: Canning
- Headquarters: Canning

Government
  - Gram Panchayats: Bansra, Daria, Dighirpar, Gopalpur, Hatpukuria, Itkhola, Matla-I, Matla-II, Nikarighata, Taldi
  - Lok Sabha constituencies: Jaynagar
  - Vidhan Sabha constituencies: Canning Paschim

Area
  - Total: 187.86 km^{2} (72.53 sq mi)

Population (2011)
  - Total: 304,724
  - Density: 1,622.1/km^{2} (4,201.2/sq mi)
  - Urban: 123,216

Demographics
  - Literacy: 70.76 per cent
  - Sex ratio: 964 ♂/♀

Languages
  - Official: Bengali
  - Additional official: English
- Time zone: UTC+05:30 (IST)
- Website: s24pgs.gov.in

Canning I is a community development block that forms an administrative division in Canning subdivision of South 24 Parganas district in the Indian state of West Bengal.

== Geography ==

Canning I CD block is located at 22°18′50″N 88°39′54″E. It has an average elevation of 6 metres (20 ft).

Canning I CD block is bounded by Canning II CD block in the north, Basanti CD block in the east and south, Kultali, Jaynagar I and Baruipur and small part of Sonarpur CD blocks in the west.

South 24 Parganas district is divided into two distinct physiographic zones: the marine-riverine delta in the north and the marine delta zone in the south. As the sea receded southwards, in the sub-recent geological period, a large low-lying plain got exposed. Both tidal inflows and the rivers have been depositing sediments in this plain. The periodical collapse of both the natural levees and man-made embankments speed up the process of filling up of the depressions containing brackish water wetlands. The marine delta in the south is formed of interlacing tidal channels. As non-saline water for irrigation is scarce, agriculture is monsoon dominated. Some parts of the wetlands are still preserved for raising fish.

Canning I CD block has an area of 187.86 km^{2}. It has 1 panchayat samity, 10 gram panchayats, 196 gram sansads (village councils), 61 mouzas and 53 inhabited villages, as per the District Statistical Handbook for South Twenty-four Parganas. Canning and Jibantala police stations serve this CD Block. Headquarters of this CD block is at Canning.

Canning I CD block has 64.61 km of embankments. Breaches in these embankments varied from 1.5 km in 2004-05 to 4.5 km in 2005-06. Embankments raised along rivers are of critical importance for the safety of lives and protection of crops, against daily tides and tidal surges. Technologically the embankment structures are weak and there is need of proper drainage of accumulated rain water through sluice gates. Crude cuts in embankments for drainage of accumulated rain water and channels built for providing water to large fisheries (bheris) also add to the hazards. Cyclones and tropical depressions are regular threats.

Gram panchayats of Canning I CD block/panchayat samiti are: Bansra, Daria, Dighirpar, Gopalpur, Hatpukuria, Itkhola, Matla-I, Matla-II, Nikarighata and Taldi.

== Demographics ==
=== Population ===
As per 2011 Census of India, Canning I CD block had a total population of 304,724, of which 181,508 were rural and 123,216 were urban. There were 155,126 (51%) males and 149,598 (49%) females. Population below 6 years was 44,344. Scheduled Castes numbered 144,906 (47.55%) and Scheduled Tribes numbered 3,710 (1.22%).

As per 2001 Census of India, Canning I CD block had a total population of 244,354, out of which 125,216 were males and 119,138 were females. Canning I CD block registered a population growth of 24.48 per cent during the 1991-2001 decade. Decadal growth for South 24 Parganas district was 20.89 per cent. Decadal growth in West Bengal was 17.84 per cent. Scheduled Castes at 126,485 formed about one-half the population. Scheduled Tribes numbered 6,731.

Census Towns in Canning I CD block (2011 census figures in brackets): Kalaria (10,075), Gaur Daha (5,260), Banshra (29,521), Rajapur (9,754), Taldi (12,459), Bayarsingh (8,346), Matla (31,920) and Dighirpar (15,881).

Large villages (with 4,000+ population) in Canning I CD block (2011 census figures in brackets): Khas Kumarkhali (7,227), Sibnagar (5,667), Daria (4,900), Bhaleya (5,858), Hatpukhuria (4,629), Devis Abad (8,128), Dharmatala (5,003), Duttababur Abad (6,095), Gopalpur (4,958), Hero Bhanga (7,339), Uttar Redokhali (5,006), Maukhali (4,164), Uttar Angad Baria (5,141), Kumarsa Chak (7,334), Banibadabede Khali (4,930), Budh Khali (8,908), Gola Bari (4,896) and Modhu Khali (5,546).

Other villages in Canning I CD block include (2011 census figures in brackets): Nikarighata (3,419), Tangrakhali (1,221).

=== Literacy ===
As per the 2011 census, the total number of literates in Canning I CD block was 184,241 (70.76% of the population over 6 years) out of which males numbered 103,611 (78.31% of the male population over 6 years) and females numbered 80,630 (62.95% of the female population over 6 years). The gender disparity (the difference between female and male literacy rates) was 15.36%.

As per 2011 Census of India, literacy in South 24 Parganas district was 77.51 Literacy in West Bengal was 77.08% in 2011. Literacy in India in 2011 was 74.04%.

As per 2001 Census of India, Canning I CD block had a total literacy of 60.49 per cent for the 6+ age group. While male literacy was 72.56 per cent female literacy was 47.79 per cent. South 24 Parganas district had a total literacy of 69.45 per cent, male literacy being 79.19 per cent and female literacy being 59.01 per cent.

See also – List of West Bengal districts ranked by literacy rate

Literacy in CD blocks of
South 24 Parganas district
Alipore Sadar subdivision
Bishnupur I – 78.33%
Bishnupur II – 81.37%
Budge Budge I – 80.57%
Budge Budge II – 79.13%
Thakurpukur Maheshtala – 83.54%
Baruipur subdivision
Baruipur – 76.46%
Bhangar I – 72.06%
Bhangar II – 74.49%
Jaynagar I – 73.17%
Jaynagar II – 69.71%
Kultali – 69.37%
Sonarpur – 79.70%
Canning subdivision
Basanti – 68.32%
Canning I – 70.76%
Canning II – 66.51%
Gosaba – 78.98%
Diamond Harbour subdivision
Diamond Harbour I – 75.72%
Diamond Harbour II – 76.91%
Falta – 77.17%
Kulpi – 75.49%
Magrahat I – 73.82%
Magrahat II – 77.41%
Mandirbazar – 75.89%
Mathurapur I – 73.93%
Mathurapur II – 77.77%
Kakdwip subdivision
Kakdwip – 77.93%
Namkhana – 85.72
Patharpratima – 82.11%
Sagar – 84.21%
Source: 2011 Census: CD Block Wise
Primary Census Abstract Data

=== Language ===
Languages of Canning I CD block (2011)
1. Bengali (99.5%)
2. Hindi (0.51%)
3. Urdu (0.02%)
4. Others (0.01%)

At the time of the 2011 census, 99.46% of the population spoke Bengali, 0.51% Hindi and 0.02% Urdu as their first language.

=== Religion ===
Religion in Canning I CD block (2011)
Hinduism	61.97%
Islam	37.49%
Other or not stated	0.54%

In the 2011 Census of India, Hindus numbered 188,849 and formed 61.97% of the population in Canning I CD block. Muslims numbered 114,252 and formed 37.49% of the population. Others numbered 1,623 and formed 0.54% of the population. Amongst the others, Christians numbered 978. In 2001, Hindus and Muslims made up 65.32% and 34.34% of the population respectively.

The proportion of Hindus in South Twenty-four Parganas district has declined from 76.0% in 1961 to 63.2% in 2011. The proportion of Muslims in South Twenty-four Parganas district has increased from 23.4% to 35.6% during the same period. Christians formed 0.8% in 2011.

== Rural poverty ==
As per the Human Development Report for South 24 Parganas district, published in 2009, in Canning I CD block the percentage of households below poverty line was 31.05%. The poverty rates were very high in the Sundarbans settlements with all thirteen CD blocks registering poverty ratios above 30% and eight CD blocks had more than 40% of the population in the BPL category. The Sundarban region remains the most backward region in terms of quality of life. As per rural household survey in 2005, the proportion of households in South 24 Parganas with poverty rates below poverty line was 34.11%, way above the state and national poverty ratios.

== Economy ==
=== Livelihood ===
Livelihood
in Canning I CD block
1. Cultivators (12.2%)
2. Agricultural labourers (22.6%)
3. Household industries (10.8%)
4. Other Workers (54.4%)

In Canning I CD block in 2011, amongst the class of total workers, cultivators numbered 13,339 and formed 12.25%, agricultural labourers numbered 24,571 and formed 22.57%, household industry workers numbered 11,721 and formed 10.77% and other workers numbered 59,217 and formed 54.40%. Total workers numbered 108,848 and formed 35.72% of the total population, and non-workers numbered 195,876 and formed 64.28% of the population.

The District Human Development Report points out that in the blocks of region situated in the close proximity of the Kolkata metropolis, overwhelming majority are involved in the non-agricultural sector for their livelihood. On the other hand, in the Sundarban region, overwhelming majority are dependent on agriculture. In the intermediate region, there is again predominance of the non-agricultural sector. Though the region is not very close to Kolkata, many places are well connected and some industrial/ economic development has taken place.

Note: In the census records a person is considered a cultivator, if the person is engaged in cultivation/ supervision of land owned by self/government/institution. When a person who works on another person's land for wages in cash or kind or share, is regarded as an agricultural labourer. Household industry is defined as an industry conducted by one or more members of the family within the household or village, and one that does not qualify for registration as a factory under the Factories Act. Other workers are persons engaged in some economic activity other than cultivators, agricultural labourers and household workers. It includes factory, mining, plantation, transport and office workers, those engaged in business and commerce, teachers, entertainment artistes and so on.

=== Infrastructure ===
There are 53 inhabited villages in Canning I CD block, as per the District Census Handbook, South Twenty-four Parganas, 2011. 100% villages have power supply. 53 villages (100%) have drinking water supply. 15 villages (28.30%) have post offices. 46 villages (86.79%) have telephones (including landlines, public call offices and mobile phones). 12 villages (22.64%) have pucca (paved) approach roads and 15 villages (28.30%) have transport communication (includes bus service, rail facility and navigable waterways). 1 village (1.89%) has an agricultural credit society and 4 villages (7.55%) have banks.

=== Agriculture ===
South 24 Parganas had played a significant role in the Tebhaga movement launched by the Communist Party of India in 1946. Subsequently, Operation Barga was aimed at securing tenancy rights for the peasants. In Canning I CD block 3,452.16 acres of land was acquired and vested. Out of this 2,831.61 acres or 82,02% of the vested land was distributed among the peasants. The total number of patta (document) holders was 9,254.

According to the District Human Development Report, agriculture is an important source of livelihood in South Twentyfour Parganas district. The amount of cultivable land per agricultural worker is only 0.41 hectare in the district. Moreover, the irrigation facilities have not been extended to a satisfactory scale. Agriculture mostly remains a mono-cropped activity.

As per the District Census Handbook, the saline soil of the district is unfit for cultivation, but the non-salty lands are very fertile. While rice is the main food crop, jute is the main cash crop.

In 2013-14, there were 70 fertiliser depots, 11 seed stores and 54 fair price shops in Canning I CD block.

In 2013–14, Canning I CD block produced 3,325 tonnes of Aman paddy, the main winter crop, from 2,224 hectares, 654 tonnes of Aus paddy (summer crop) from 253 hectares, 11,900 tonnes of Boro paddy (spring crop) from 3,514 hectares and 759 tonnes of potatoes from 23 hectares. It also produced pulses and oilseeds.

=== Pisciculture ===
In Canning I CD block, in 2013-14, net area under effective pisciculture was 6,425 hectares, engaging 44,445 persons in the profession, and with an approximate annual production of 151,940 quintals.

Pisciculture is an important source of employment in South 24 Parganas district. As of 2001, more than 4.5 lakh people were engaged in Pisciculture. Out of this 2.57 lakhs were from the 13 blocks in the Sundarbans.

=== Banking ===
In 2013-14, Canning I CD block had offices of 6 commercial banks and 1 gramin banks.

=== Backward Regions Grant Fund ===
South 24 Parganas district is listed as a backward region and receives financial support from the Backward Regions Grant Fund. The fund, created by the Government of India, is designed to redress regional imbalances in development. As of 2012, 272 districts across the country were listed under this scheme. The list includes 11 districts of West Bengal.

== Transport ==
Canning I CD block has 1 ferry service and 3 originating/ terminating bus routes

Piali, Gourdaha, Ghutiari Sharif, Taldi, Matla and Canning are stations on the Sealdah South section.

== Education ==
In 2013-14, Canning I CD block had 119 primary schools with 20,202 students, 16 middle schools with 2,046 students, 3 high schools with 1,984 students and 13 higher secondary schools with 18,525 students. Canning CD block had 1 general degree college with 2,495 students and 535 institutions for special and non-formal education with 29,795 students.

See also – Education in India

As per the 2011 census, in Canning I CD block, amongst the 53 inhabited villages, 2 villages did not have a school, 37 villages had two or more primary schools, 23 villages had at least 1 primary and 1 middle school and 13 villages had at least 1 middle and 1 secondary school.

Bankim Sardar College was established at Tangrakhali in 1955.

== Healthcare ==
Certain areas of South 24 Parganas district have been identified where ground water is affected by Arsenic Contamination. High levels of arsenic in ground water were found in twelve CD blocks of the district. Water samples collected from tubewells in the affected places contained arsenic above the normal level (10 micrograms per litre as specified by the World Health Organization). The affected CD blocks are Baruipur, Bhangar I, Bhangar II, Bishnupur I, Bishnupur II, Basanti, Budge Budge II, Canning I, Canning II, Sonarpur, Magrahat II and Jaynagar I.

In 2014, Canning I CD block had 1 hospital, 1 block primary health centre and 6 private nursing homes with total 145 beds and 23 doctors (excluding private bodies). It had 56 family welfare subcentres. 15,961 patients were treated indoor and 381,408 patients were treated outdoor in the hospitals, health centres and subcentres of the CD block.

As per 2011 census, in Canning I CD block, 2 villages had community health centres, 34 villages had primary health subcentres, 3 villages had maternity and child welfare centres, 10 villages had medicine shops and out of the 53 inhabited villages 7 villages had no medical facilities.

Ghutiari Sharif Block Primary Health Centre at Ghutiari Sharif, with 10 beds, is the major government medical facility in Canning I CD block.
