= Deuli, Bangladesh =

Deuli
- Village
- Location in Bangladesh
- Coordinates: 22°34′N 90°22′E
- Country: Bangladesh
- Division: Barisal Division
- District: Barisal District
- Time zone: UTC+6 (Bangladesh Time)

Deuli is a village in Barisal District in the Barisal Division of southern-central Bangladesh.
