= Canning II =

Community Development Block in West Bengal, India

- Community Development Block
- Location of Canning II community development block in South 24 Parganas district
- Coordinates: 22.3139917°N 88.6650753°E
- Country: India
- State: West Bengal
- Division: Presidency
- District: South 24 Parganas
- Subdivision: Canning
- Headquarters: Deuli

Government
  - Gram Panchayats: Atharobanki, Deuli-I, Deuli-II, Kalikatala, Matherdighi, Narayanpur, Sarengabad, Tambuldaha-I, Tambuldaha-II
  - Lok Sabha constituencies: Jaynagar
  - Vidhan Sabha constituencies: Canning Purba, Canning Paschim, Basanti

Area
  - Total: 214.93 km^{2} (82.98 sq mi)

Population (2011)
  - Total: 252,523
  - Density: 1,174.9/km^{2} (3,043.0/sq mi)
  - Urban: 11,182

Demographics
  - Literacy: 66.51 per cent
  - Sex ratio: 966 ♂/♀

Languages
  - Official: Bengali
  - Additional official: English
- Time zone: UTC+05:30 (IST)
- Website: s24pgs.gov.in

Canning II is a community development block that forms an administrative division in Canning subdivision of South 24 Parganas district in the Indian state of West Bengal.

== Geography ==

Canning II CD block is located at 22°18′50″N 88°39′54″E. It has an average elevation of 6 metres (20 ft).

Canning II CD block is bounded by Bhangar I CD block in the north, Sandeshkhali I, Sandeshkhali II and Hingalganj CD blocks in North 24 Parganas district in the east, Basanti CD block in the south, Canning I, Baruipur and Sonarpur CD blocks in the west.

South 24 Parganas district is divided into two distinct physiographic zones: the marine-riverine delta in the north and the marine delta zone in the south. As the sea receded southwards, in the sub-recent geological period, a large low-lying plain got exposed. Both tidal inflows and the rivers have been depositing sediments in this plain. The periodical collapse of both the natural levees and man-made embankments speed up the process of filling up of the depressions containing brackish water wetlands. The marine delta in the south is formed of interlacing tidal channels. As non-saline water for irrigation is scarce, agriculture is monsoon dominated. Some parts of the wetlands are still preserved for raising fish.

Canning II CD block has an area of 214.93 km^{2}. It has 1 panchayat samity, 9 gram panchayats, 146 gram sansads (village councils), 62 mouzas and 61 inhabited villages, as per the District Statistical Handbook for South Twenty-four Parganas. Jibantala police station serves this CD Block. Headquarters of this CD block is at Deuli.

Canning II CD block has 42.63 km of embankments. Breaches in these embankments varied from 0.4 km in 2004-05 to 0.9 km in 2005-06. Embankments raised along rivers are of critical importance for the safety of lives and protection of crops, against daily tides and tidal surges. Technologically the embankment structures are weak and there is need of proper drainage of accumulated rain water through sluice gates. Crude cuts in embankments for drainage of accumulated rain water and channels built for providing water to large fisheries (bheris) also add to the hazards. Cyclones and tropical depressions are regular threats.

Gram panchayats of Canning II CD block/panchayat samiti are: Atharobanki, Deuli-I, Deuli-II, Kalikatala, Matherdighi, Narayanpur, Sarengabad, Tambuldaha-I and Tambuldaha-II.

== Demographics ==
=== Population ===
As per 2011 Census of India, Canning II CD block had a total population of 252,523, of which 241,333 were rural and 11,182 were urban. There were 128,438 (51%) males and 124,085 (49%) females. Population below 6 years was 43,455. Scheduled Castes numbered 52,859 (20.93%) and Scheduled Tribes numbered 14,910 (5.90%).

As per 2001 Census of India, Canning II CD block had a total population of 195,967, out of which 100,172 were males and 95,795 were females. Canning II CD block registered a population growth of 29.24 per cent during the 1991-2001 decade. Decadal growth for South 24 Parganas district was 20.89 per cent. Decadal growth in West Bengal was 17.84 per cent. Scheduled Castes at 50,436 formed about one-fourth of the population. Scheduled Tribes numbered 14,597.

Census Town in Canning II CD block (2011 census figures in brackets): Makhal Tala (11,192).

Large villages (with 4,000+ population) in Canning II CD block (2011 census figures in brackets): Kalugachhi (4,395), Mallik Kati (4,683), Chandibari (4,948), Miagheri (4,134), Haora Mari (4,136), Netra (4,154), Iswaripur (7,955), Nagartala (10,419), Patikhali (8,937), Bibir Abad (4,543), Saranger Abad (12,299), Maukhali (7,996), Jogendra Nagar (15,112), Kalikatala (17,598), Mather Dighi (13,524), Daharani (11,231), Atharobanki (13,503), Gabbuni (5,542), Banamalipur (5,271) and Narayanpur (9,468).

Other villages in Canning II CD block include (2011 census figures in brackets): Jibantala (2,355), Deuli (2,753) and Tambul Daha (928).

=== Literacy ===
As per the 2011 census, the total number of literates in Canning II CD block was 139,058 (66.51% of the population over 6 years) out of which males numbered 77,784 (73.19% of the male population over 6 years) and females numbered 61,274 (59.61% of the female population over 6 years). The gender disparity (the difference between female and male literacy rates) was 13.57%.

As per 2011 Census of India, literacy in South 24 Parganas district was 77.51 Literacy in West Bengal was 77.08% in 2011. Literacy in India in 2011 was 74.04%.

As per 2001 Census of India, Canning II CD Block had a total literacy of 52.36 per cent for the 6+ age group. While male literacy was 63.68 per cent female literacy was 40.36 per cent. South 24 Parganas district had a total literacy of 69.45 per cent, male literacy being 79.19 per cent and female literacy being 59.01 per cent.

See also – List of West Bengal districts ranked by literacy rate

Literacy in CD blocks of
South 24 Parganas district
Alipore Sadar subdivision
Bishnupur I – 78.33%
Bishnupur II – 81.37%
Budge Budge I – 80.57%
Budge Budge II – 79.13%
Thakurpukur Maheshtala – 83.54%
Baruipur subdivision
Baruipur – 76.46%
Bhangar I – 72.06%
Bhangar II – 74.49%
Jaynagar I – 73.17%
Jaynagar II – 69.71%
Kultali – 69.37%
Sonarpur – 79.70%
Canning subdivision
Basanti – 68.32%
Canning I – 70.76%
Canning II – 66.51%
Gosaba – 78.98%
Diamond Harbour subdivision
Diamond Harbour I – 75.72%
Diamond Harbour II – 76.91%
Falta – 77.17%
Kulpi – 75.49%
Magrahat I – 73.82%
Magrahat II – 77.41%
Mandirbazar – 75.89%
Mathurapur I – 73.93%
Mathurapur II – 77.77%
Kakdwip subdivision
Kakdwip – 77.93%
Namkhana – 85.72
Patharpratima – 82.11%
Sagar – 84.21%
Source: 2011 Census: CD Block Wise
Primary Census Abstract Data

=== Language ===
Languages of Canning II block (2011)
1. Bengali (98.0%)
2. Sadri (1.83%)
3. Hindi (0.17%)
4. Urdu (0.02%)
5. Others (0.01%)

At the time of the 2011 census, 97.97% of the population spoke Bengali, 1.83% Sadri, 0.17% Hindi and 0.02% Urdu as their first language.

=== Religion ===
Religion in Canning II CD block (2011)
Islam	67.08%
Hinduism	31.08%
Other (tribal religion)	1.06%
Other or not stated	0.78%

In the 2011 Census of India, Muslims numbered 169,389 and formed 67.08% of the population in Canning II CD block. Hindus numbered 78,472 and formed 31.08% of the population. Others numbered 4,662 and formed 1.85% of the population. Amongst the others, Christians numbered 953. In 2001, Muslims and Hindus made up 63.17% and 36.51% of the population respectively.

The proportion of Hindus in South Twenty-four Parganas district has declined from 76.0% in 1961 to 63.2% in 2011. The proportion of Muslims in South Twenty-four Parganas district has increased from 23.4% to 35.6% during the same period. Christians formed 0.8% in 2011.

== Rural poverty ==
As per the Human Development Report for South 24 Parganas district, published in 2009, in Canning II CD block the percentage of households below poverty line was 50.32%, a high level of poverty, next only to 64.89% of Basanti CD block and 52.64% of Kulpi CD block. The poverty rates were very high in the Sundarbans settlements with all thirteen CD blocks registering poverty ratios above 30% and eight CD blocks had more than 40% of the population in the BPL category. The Sundarban region remains the most backward region in terms of quality of life. As per rural household survey in 2005, the proportion of households in South 24 Parganas with poverty rates below poverty line was 34.11%, way above the state and national poverty ratios.

== Economy ==
=== Livelihood ===
Livelihood
in Canning II CD block
1. Cultivators (14.3%)
2. Agricultural labourers (56.4%)
3. Household industries (3.95%)
4. Other Workers (25.3%)

In Canning II CD block in 2011, amongst the class of total workers, cultivators numbered 12,042 and formed 14.35%, agricultural labourers numbered 47,330 and formed 56.41%, household industry workers numbered 3,394 and formed 3.95% and other workers numbered 21,213 and formed 25.28%. Total workers numbered 83,899 and formed 33.22% of the total population, and non-workers numbered 168,624 and formed 66.78% of the population.

The District Human Development Report points out that in the blocks of region situated in the close proximity of the Kolkata metropolis, overwhelming majority are involved in the non-agricultural sector for their livelihood. On the other hand, in the Sundarban region, overwhelming majority are dependent on agriculture. In the intermediate region, there is again predominance of the non-agricultural sector. Though the region is not very close to Kolkata, many places are well connected and some industrial/ economic development has taken place.

Note: In the census records a person is considered a cultivator, if the person is engaged in cultivation/ supervision of land owned by self/government/institution. When a person who works on another person's land for wages in cash or kind or share, is regarded as an agricultural labourer. Household industry is defined as an industry conducted by one or more members of the family within the household or village, and one that does not qualify for registration as a factory under the Factories Act. Other workers are persons engaged in some economic activity other than cultivators, agricultural labourers and household workers. It includes factory, mining, plantation, transport and office workers, those engaged in business and commerce, teachers, entertainment artistes and so on.

=== Infrastructure ===
There are 61 inhabited villages in Canning II CD block, as per the District Census Handbook, South Twenty-four Parganas, 2011. 100% villages have power supply. 61 villages (100%) have drinking water supply. 20 villages (32.79%) have post offices. 57 villages (93.44%) have telephones (including landlines, public call offices and mobile phones). 25 villages (40.98%) have pucca (paved) approach roads and 10 villages (16.30%) have transport communication (includes bus service, rail facility and navigable waterways). 2 villages (3.28%) have banks.

=== Agriculture ===
South 24 Parganas had played a significant role in the Tebhaga movement launched by the Communist Party of India in 1946. Subsequently, Operation Barga was aimed at securing tenancy rights for the peasants. In Canning II CD block 8,190.21 acres of land was acquired and vested. Out of this 4,928.54 acres or 60.18% of the vested land was distributed amongst the peasants. The total number of patta (document) holders was 11,125.

According to the District Human Development Report, agriculture is an important source of livelihood in South Twentyfour Parganas district. The amount of cultivable land per agricultural worker is only 0.41 hectare in the district. Moreover, the irrigation facilities have not been extended to a satisfactory scale. Agriculture mostly remains a mono-cropped activity.

As per the District Census Handbook, the saline soil of the district is unfit for cultivation, but the non-salty lands are very fertile. While rice is the main food crop, jute is the main cash crop.

In 2013-14, there were 70 fertiliser depots, 10 seed stores and 42 fair price shops in Canning II CD block.

In 2013–14, Canning II CD block produced 2,552 tonnes of Aman paddy, the main winter crop, from 1,941 hectares, 473 tonnes of Aus paddy (summer crop) from 183 hectares, 14,465 tonnes of Boro paddy (spring crop) from 3,566 hectares, 486 tonnes of jute from 23 hectares and 17,167 tonnes of potatoes from 644 hectares. It also produced pulses and oilseeds.

=== Pisciculture ===
In Canning II CD block, in 2013-14, net area under effective pisciculture was 7,304 hectares, engaging 54,720 persons in the profession, and with an approximate annual production of 161,356 quintals.

Pisciculture is an important source of employment in South 24 Parganas district. As of 2001, more than 4.5 lakh people were engaged in Pisciculture. Out of this 2.57 lakhs were from the 13 blocks in the Sundarbans.

=== Banking ===
In 2013-14, Canning II CD block had offices of 3 commercial banks and 2 gramin banks.

=== Backward Regions Grant Fund ===
South 24 Parganas district is listed as a backward region and receives financial support from the Backward Regions Grant Fund. The fund, created by the Government of India, is designed to redress regional imbalances in development. As of 2012, 272 districts across the country were listed under this scheme. The list includes 11 districts of West Bengal.

== Transport ==
Canning II CD block has 1 ferry service. The nearest railway station is 13 km from the block headquarters.

== Education ==
In 2013-14, Canning II CD block had 93 primary schools with 21,638 students, 9 middle schools with 1,218 students, 1 high school with 674 students and 9 higher secondary schools with 11,441 students. Canning II CD block had 1 general degree college with 506 students and 422 institutions for special and non-formal education with 23,538 students.

See also – Education in India

As per the 2011 census, in Canning II CD block, amongst the 61 inhabited villages, 7 villages did not have a school, 21 villages had two or more primary schools, 23 villages had at least 1 primary and 1 middle school and 14 villages had at least 1 middle and 1 secondary school.

Jibantala Rokeya Mahavidyalaya was established at Mallikati, Jibantala, in 2001.

== Healthcare ==
Certain areas of South 24 Parganas district have been identified where ground water is affected by Arsenic Contamination. High levels of arsenic in ground water were found in twelve CD blocks of the district. Water samples collected from tubewells in the affected places contained arsenic above the normal level (10 micrograms per litre as specified by the World Health Organization). The affected CD blocks are Baruipur, Bhangar I, Bhangar II, Bishnupur I, Bishnupur II, Basanti, Budge Budge II, Canning I, Canning II, Sonarpur, Magrahat II and Jaynagar I.

In 2014, Canning II CD block had 1 rural hospital, 1 primary health centre and 3 private nursing homes with total 55 beds and 9 doctors (excluding private bodies). It had 45 family welfare subcentres. 1,907 patients were treated indoor and 158,143 patients were treated outdoor in the hospitals, health centres and subcentres of the CD block.

As per 2011 census, in Canning II CD block, 3 villages had primary health centres, 32 villages had primary health subcentres, 4 villages had maternity and child welfare centres, 9 villages had medicine shops and out of the 61 inhabited villages 26 villages had no medical facilities.

Matherdighi Rural Hospital at Matherdighi, with 30 beds, is the major government medical facility in Canning II CD block. There is a primary health centre at Kuchitala (Sarangabad) (with 10 beds).
