= Deuli, India =

Deuli
- Census Town
- Location in West Bengal, India Deuli (India)
- Coordinates: 22.0766°N 87.3287°E
- Country: India
- State: West Bengal
- District: Paschim Medinipur

Area
  - Total: 4.09 km^{2} (1.58 sq mi)

Population (2011)
  - Total: 9,007
  - Density: 2,200/km^{2} (5,700/sq mi)

Languages
  - Official: Bengali, English
- Time zone: UTC+5:30 (IST)
- ISO 3166 code: IN-WB
- Vehicle registration: WB
- Website: paschimmedinipur.gov.in

Deuli is a census town in the Narayangarh CD block in the Kharagpur subdivision of the Paschim Medinipur district in the state of West Bengal, India.

== Geography ==
Cities and towns in the southern portion of Kharagpur subdivision (including Dantan I & II, Mohanpur, Keshiary, Narayangarh and Sabang CD blocks) of Paschim Medinipur district
CT: census town, R: rural/ urban centre, H: historical/ religious centre
Owing to space constraints in the small map, the actual locations in a larger map may vary slightly

=== Location ===
Deuli is located at 22.0776°N 87.3287°E

=== Area overview ===
Kharagpur subdivision, shown partly in the map alongside, mostly has alluvial soils, except in two CD blocks in the west – Kharagpur I and Keshiary, which mostly have lateritic soils. Around 74% of the total cultivated area is cropped more than once during a single year. With a density of population of 787 per km^{2}nearly half of the district’s population resides in this subdivision. 14.33% of the population lives in urban areas and 86.67% lives in the rural areas.

Note: The map alongside presents some of the notable locations in the subdivision. All places marked in the map are linked in the larger full screen map.

== Demographics ==
According to the 2011 Census of India, Deuli had a total population of 9,007 of which 4,468 (50%) were males and 4,539 (50%) were females. Population in the age range 0–6 years was 893. The total number of literate persons in Deuli was 7,138 (79.25% of the population over 6 years).

As of 2001 India census, Deuli had a population of 8165. Males constituted 52% of the population and females 48%. Deuli had an average literacy rate of 69%, higher than the national average of 59.5%: male literacy is 77% and, female literacy is 62%. In Deuli, 11% of the population were under 6 years of age.

== Infrastructure ==
According to the District Census Handbook 2011, Paschim Medinipur, Deuli covered an area of 4.09 km^{2}. Among the civic amenities, it had 24 km roads with open drains, the protected water supply involved tap water from untreated sources, borewell, tubewell. It had 4,000 domestic electric connections, 300 road lighting points. Among the medical facilities, it had 1 maternity and child welfare centre. Among the educational facilities it had were 6 primary schools, 2 middle schools, 2 secondary schools, 1 senior secondary school. It had 1 recognised shorthand, typewriting and vocational training institute. Among the social, recreational and cultural facilities, it had 1 public library, 1 reading room. It had branch offices of 2 nationalised banks, 3 cooperative banks, 1 agricultural credit society.
