= Matla Halt railway station =

Railway station in West Bengal, India

Matla Halt

General information
- Other names: Chandkhali Halt
- Location: Matla, Chadkhali, Canning I South 24 Parganas, West Bengal; India
- Coordinates: 22.333146°N 88.630248°E
- Elevation: 6 metres (20 ft)
- System: Kolkata Suburban Railway Station
- Owner: Indian Railways
- Operator: Eastern Railway
- Line: Canning Branch line
- Platforms: 2
- Tracks: 2

Construction
- Structure type: Standard (on-ground station)
- Parking: Not Available
- Cycle facilities: Not Available
- Accessible: Not Available

Other information
- Status: Functioning
- Station code: MATL
- Zone(s): Eastern Railway
- Division(s): Sealdah

History
- Opened: 15 August 2022; 4 years ago
- Electrified: 1965–66
- Former names: Eastern Bengal Railway
Services
Preceding station	Kolkata Suburban Railway	Following station
Canning Terminus	Sealdah South Canning Branch line	Taldi towards Sealdah
Route map
Location

Matla Halt railway station (formerly known as Chandkhali Halt railway station) is a Kolkata Suburban Railway Station on the Canning Branch line. It is under the jurisdiction of the Sealdah railway division in the Eastern Railway zone of the Indian Railways. Matla Halt railway station is situated at Matla in South 24 Parganas district in the Indian state of West Bengal.

== History ==
In 1862, the Eastern Bengal Railway constructed a 1,676 mm (5 ft 6 in)-wide broad-gauge railway from Sonarpur Junction to Canning via Matla Halt.

== Electrification ==
Electrification from Sonarpur Junction to Canning including Matla Halt was completed with 25 kV AC overhead system in 1965–66.

== Station complex ==
The platform is very much well sheltered. The station possesses many facilities including water and sanitation. There is a proper approach road to this station.
