= Canning subdivision =

Subdivision in West Bengal, India

Canning
- Subdivision
- Location of Canning subdivision in South 24 Parganas district
- Coordinates: 22.3139917°N 88.6650753°E
- Country: India
- State: West Bengal
- Division: Presidency
- District: South 24 Parganas
- Headquarters: Canning

Government
  - CD Blocks: Canning I, Canning II, Basanti, Gosaba
  - Lok Sabha constituencies: Jaynagar
  - Vidhan Sabha constituencies: Gosaba, Basanti, Canning Paschim, Canning Purba

Area
  - Total: 1,103.74 km^{2} (426.16 sq mi)

Population (2011)
  - Total: 1,140,562
  - Density: 1,033.36/km^{2} (2,676.39/sq mi)
  - Urban: 141,023

Demographics
  - Literacy: 70.98 per cent
  - Sex ratio: 964 ♂/♀

Languages
  - Official: Bengali
  - Additional official: English
- Time zone: UTC+05:30 (IST)
- Website: s24pgs.gov.in

Canning subdivision is an administrative subdivision of South 24 Parganas district in the Indian state of West Bengal.

== Overview ==
Canning subdivision has a very low level of urbanization. Only 12.37% of the population lives in the urban areas and 87.63% lives in the rural areas. The entire district is situated in the Ganges Delta with numerous islands in the southern part of the region. The area borders on the Sundarbans National Park and a major portion of it is a part of the Sundarbans settlements. It is a flat low-lying area in the South Bidyadhari plains. The Matla River is prominent and there are many streams and water channels locally known as khals. A comparatively recent country-wide development is the guarding of the coastal areas with special coastal force.

== Subdivisions ==

South 24 Parganas district is divided into five administrative subdivisions:

Subdivision	Headquarters	Area (km^{2})	Population (2011)	Urban population %	Rural Population %
Alipore Sadar	Alipore	427.43	1,490,342	59.85	40.15
Baruipur	Baruipur	1,355.44	2,396,643	31.05	68.95
Canning	Canning	1,103.73	1,140,562	12.37	87.63
Diamond Harbour	Diamond Harbour	1,264.68	2,125,758	14.61	85.39
Kakdwip	Kakdwip	1,389.93	1,008,653	0	100
South 24 Parganas	Alipore	9,960,00	8,161,961	25.58	74.42

13.97% of the total population of South 24 Parganas district live in Canning subdivision.

== Administrative units ==
Canning subdivision has 6 police stations, 4 community development blocks, 4 panchayat samitis, 46 gram panchayats, 241 mouzas, 228 inhabited villages and 10 census towns. The census towns are: Kalaria, Gaur Daha, Banshra, Rajapur, Taldi, Bayarsing, Matla, Dighirpar, Makhal Tala and Basanti.

== Police stations ==
Police stations in Canning subdivision have the following features and jurisdiction:

Police Station	Area covered (km^{2})	Border (km)	Municipal town/ city	CD Block
Canning	204.34	-	-	Canning I
Jibantala	238.93	-	-	Canning I, Canning II
Basanti	428	-	-	Basanti
Jharkhali Coastal	52	?	-	Basanti
Gosaba	127	?	-	Gosaba
Sundarban Coastal	2,852	?	-	Gosaba

== CD Blocks ==

Community development blocks in Canning subdivision are:

CD Block	Headquarters	Area (km^{2})	Population (2011)	SC %	ST %	Hindus %	Muslims %	Literacy rate %	Census Towns
Canning I	Canning	187.86	304,724	47.55	1.22	61.97	37.49	70.76	8
Canning II	Sarengabad	214.93	252,523	20.93	5.90	31.08	67.08	66.51	1
Basanti	Basanti	404.21	336,717	35.53	5.96	52.48	44.87	68.31	1
Gosaba	Gosaba	296.73	246,598	62.69	9.47	88.06	8.63	78.98	-

== Gram panchayats ==
The subdivision contains 46 gram panchayats under 4 community development blocks:

- Canning I CD block consists of ten gram panchayats: Bansra, Daria, Dighirpar, Gopalpur, Hatpukuria, Itkhola, Matla-I, Matla-II, Nikarighata and Taldi.
- Canning II CD block consists of nine gram panchayats: Atharobanki, Deuli-I, Deuli-II, Kalikatala, Matherdighi, Narayanpur, Sarengabad, Tambuldaha-I and Tambuldaha-II.
- Basanti CD block consists of 13 gram panchayats: Amjhara, Basanti, Bharatgarh, Charabidya, Chunakhali, Foolmalancha, Jharkhali, Jyotishpur, Kanthalberia, Maszidbati, Nafarganj, Ramchandrakhali and Uttar Mokamberia.
- Gosaba CD block consists of 14 gram panchayats: Amtali, Bali-I, Bali-II, Bipradaspur, Chhota Mollakhali, Gosaba, Kachukhali, Kumirmari, Lahiripur, Pathankhali, Radhanagar Taranagar, Rangabelia, Satjelia and Shambhunagar.

== Education ==
South 24 Parganas district had a literacy rate of 77.51% as per the provisional figures of the census of India 2011. Alipore Sadar subdivision had a literacy rate of 81.14%, Baruipur subdivision 77.45%, Canning subdivision 70.98%, Diamond Harbour subdivision 76.26% and Kakdwip subdivision 82.04%

Statistics in the table below present a comprehensive picture of the education scenario in South 24 Parganas district, with data for the year 2013–14:

Subdivision	Primary School		Middle School		High School		Higher Secondary School		General College, Univ		Technical / Professional Instt		Non-formal Education	
Subdivision	Institution	Student	Institution	Student	Institution	Student	Institution	Student	Institution	Student	Institution	Student	Institution	Student
Alipore Sadar	531	53,719	34	4,455	50	16,471	91	66,813	5	8,122	6	3,094	1,379	53,429
Baruipur	883	132,649	65	8,954	50	26,443	128	129,195	8	27,657	7	6,735	3,116	138,507
Canning	532	81,697	59	9,181	29	10,515	55	57,921	4	5,490	1	n/a	2,105	96,622
Diamond Harbour	1,212	116,407	61	6,680	98	38,470	145	113,147	7	20,061	5	1,774	3,140	137,378
Kakdwip	598	53,058	45	5,654	48	20,383	82	56,192	3	5,420	1	100	1,844	78,897
South 24 Parganas district*	3,756	437,530	264	34,924	275	118,282	501	423,268	27	66,750	20	11,703	11,584	504,833

.* Does not include data for portions of South 24 Parganas district functioning under Kolkata Municipal Corporation

The following institutions are located in Canning subdivision:

- Bankim Sardar College was established at Tangrakhali in 1955.
- Sundarban Hazi Desarat College was established at Pathankhali in 1961.
- Jibantala Rokeya Mahavidyalaya was established at Mallikati, Jibantala, in 2001.
- Sukanta College was established at Bhangonkhali in 2008.

== Healthcare ==
The table below (all data in numbers) presents an overview of the medical facilities available and patients treated in the hospitals, health centres and sub-centres in 2014 in South 24 Parganas district.

Subdivision	Health & Family Welfare Deptt, WB				Other State Govt Deptts	Local bodies	Central Govt Deptts / PSUs	NGO / Private Nursing Homes	Total	Total Number of Beds	Total Number of Doctors	Indoor Patients	Outdoor Patients
Subdivision	Hospitals	Rural Hospitals	Block Primary Health Centres	Primary Health Centres	Other State Govt Deptts	Local bodies	Central Govt Deptts / PSUs	NGO / Private Nursing Homes	Total	Total Number of Beds	Total Number of Doctors	Indoor Patients	Outdoor Patients
Alipore Sadar	-	3	3	7	1	3	-	48	65	1,159	199	33,498	633,233
Baruipur	1	6	1	18	-	2	-	66	94	1,045	201	48,114	1,266,244
Canning	1	3	1	6	-	-	-	15	26	351	49	22,467	666,377
Diamond Harbour	1	6	3	17	-	-	-	68	95	1077	169	65,051	1,325,535
Kakdwip	1	3	1	11	-	-	-	20	36	458	73	28,707	405,501
South 24 Parganas district	4	21	9	59	1	5	-	217	316	4,090	691	197,837	4,397,890

Note: The district data does not include data for portions of South 24 Parganas district functioning under Kolkata Municipal Corporation. The number of doctors exclude private bodies.

Medical facilities in Canning subdivision are as follows:

Hospitals: (Name, location, beds)

- Canning Subdivisional Hospital, Canning, 100 beds

Rural Hospitals: (Name, CD block, location, beds)

- Matherdighi Rural Hospital, Canning II CD block, Matherdighi, 30 beds
- Basanti Rural Hospital, Basanti CD block, Basanti, 30 beds
- Gosaba Rural Hospital, Gosaba CD block, Gosaba, 30 beds

Block Primary Health Centres: (Name, CD block, location, beds)

- Ghutiari Sharif Block Primary Health Centre, Canning I CD block, Ghutiari Sharif, 10 beds

Primary Health Centres: (CD block-wise)(CD block, PHC location, beds)

- Canning II CD block: Kuchitala (Sarangabad) (10)
- Basanti CD block: Mahespur (PO Bharadwazpur) (6), Kanthalberia (10), Herobhanga-Jharkhali (PO Jharkhali Bazar) (6)
- Gosaba CD block: Chhota Mollakhali (10), Dakshin Radhanagar (PO Dhalarhat) (6)

== Electoral constituencies ==
Lok Sabha (parliamentary) and Vidhan Sabha (state assembly) constituencies in Canning subdivision were as follows:

Lok Sabha constituency	Reservation	Vidhan Sabha constituency	Reservation	CD Block and/or Gram panchayats and/or municipal areas
Jaynagar	Reserved for SC	Gosaba	Reserved for SC	Gosaba CD Block, and Chunakhali and Maszidbati gram panchayats of Basanti CD Block
		Basanti	Reserved for SC	Amjhara, Basanti, Bharatgarh, Charabidya, Foolmalancha, Jharkhali, Jyotishpur, Kanthalberia, Nafarganj, Ramchandrakhali and Uttar Mokamberia gram panchayats of Basanti CD Block, and Atharobanki gram panchayat of Canning II CD Block
		Canning Paschim	Reserved for SC	Canning I CD Block, and Narayanpur gram panchayat of Canning II CD Block
		Canning Purba	None	Deuli-I, Deuli-II, Kalikatala, Matherdighi, Sarengabad, Tambuldaha-I and Tambuldaha-II gram panchayats of Canning II CD Block, and Bodra, Chandaneswar-I, Chandaneswar-II, Durgapur, Shanksahar and Tarda gram panchayats of Bhangar I CD Block
