= Canning, South 24 Parganas =

Town in West Bengal, India

Canning Gateway of the Sundarbans
- Town
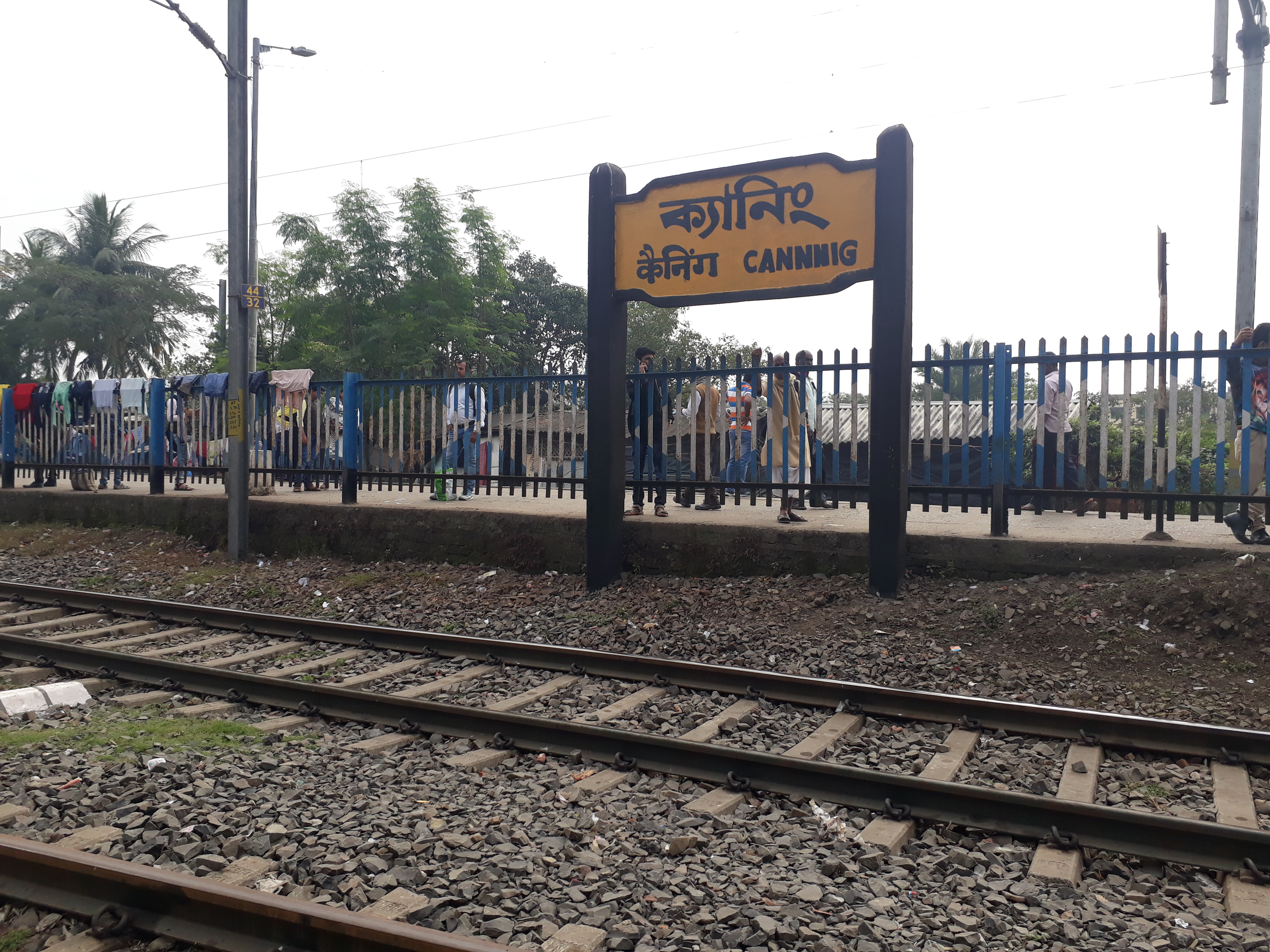
- Canning railway station

- Location in West Bengal Location in India
- Coordinates: 22.3139917°N 88.6650753°E
- Country: India
- State: West Bengal
- Division: Presidency
- District: South 24 Parganas
- Elevation: 6 m (20 ft)

Languages
  - Official: Bengali
  - Additional official: English
- Time zone: UTC+5:30 (IST)
- PIN: 743329
- Telephone code: +91 3218
- Vehicle registration: WB-19 to WB-22, WB-95 to WB-99
- Lok Sabha constituency: Jaynagar (SC)
- Vidhan Sabha constituency: Canning Purba, Canning Paschim (SC)
- Website: www.s24pgs.gov.in

Canning (Bengali: [kæn̪iŋ]) is a town of the South 24 Parganas district in the Indian state of West Bengal. It is situated on the western banks of the Matla River. It is the headquarters of the Canning subdivision.

== Etymology ==
The town of Canning is named after Charles Canning, 1st Earl Canning, who served as the Governor-General of India from 1856 to 1858, and later became India's first Viceroy from 1858 to 1862.

=== The Story Behind the Name ===
In the mid-19th century, British colonial authorities noticed that the Hooghly River leading to Kolkata (Calcutta) was heavily silting up, threatening merchant shipping. They looked for an alternative deep-water port nearby and selected a small fishing village on the banks of the Matla River, right at the edge of the Sundarbans.

=== The Vision ===
The British set out to build an ambitious grand port city here—originally named Port Canning—intended to become an alternative to Kolkata and a shipping rival to Singapore.

=== The Reality ===
Despite a massive surge in investments, land reclamation, and building a railway line to connect it to Kolkata, the venture turned out to be a "colonial blunder". The planners ignored warnings about severe cyclonic weather and a retreating river line. In 1867, a massive cyclone and tidal surge flooded the area, reducing the brand-new town to ruins. While the grand port was abandoned and the Matla River choked up, the name "Canning" stuck. Today, it is widely known as the main gateway to the Sundarbans National Park.

However before the mid-19th century, the area was just a sparse, swampy fishing village on the banks of the Matla River. Early British surveyors and locals simply referred to the spot as Matla. When the British initially set up their grand port project here in the 1850s and 1860s, it was frequently called the "Port of Mutlah" or "Matla Port" in official records, before it was formally christened Port Canning. Even today, the main local administrative sections of the town are divided into "Matla-I" and "Matla-II".

== History ==
H. E. A. Cotton writes, "The year 1864… It witnessed also the speculative mania over an unlucky scheme for the reclamation of the Sunderbans, of which nothing remains but the deserted wharves of Port Canning, but which resulted in ruin to many". The idea of developing a major port at the town faded with the choking of the Matla River as a result of inadequate headwater supply.

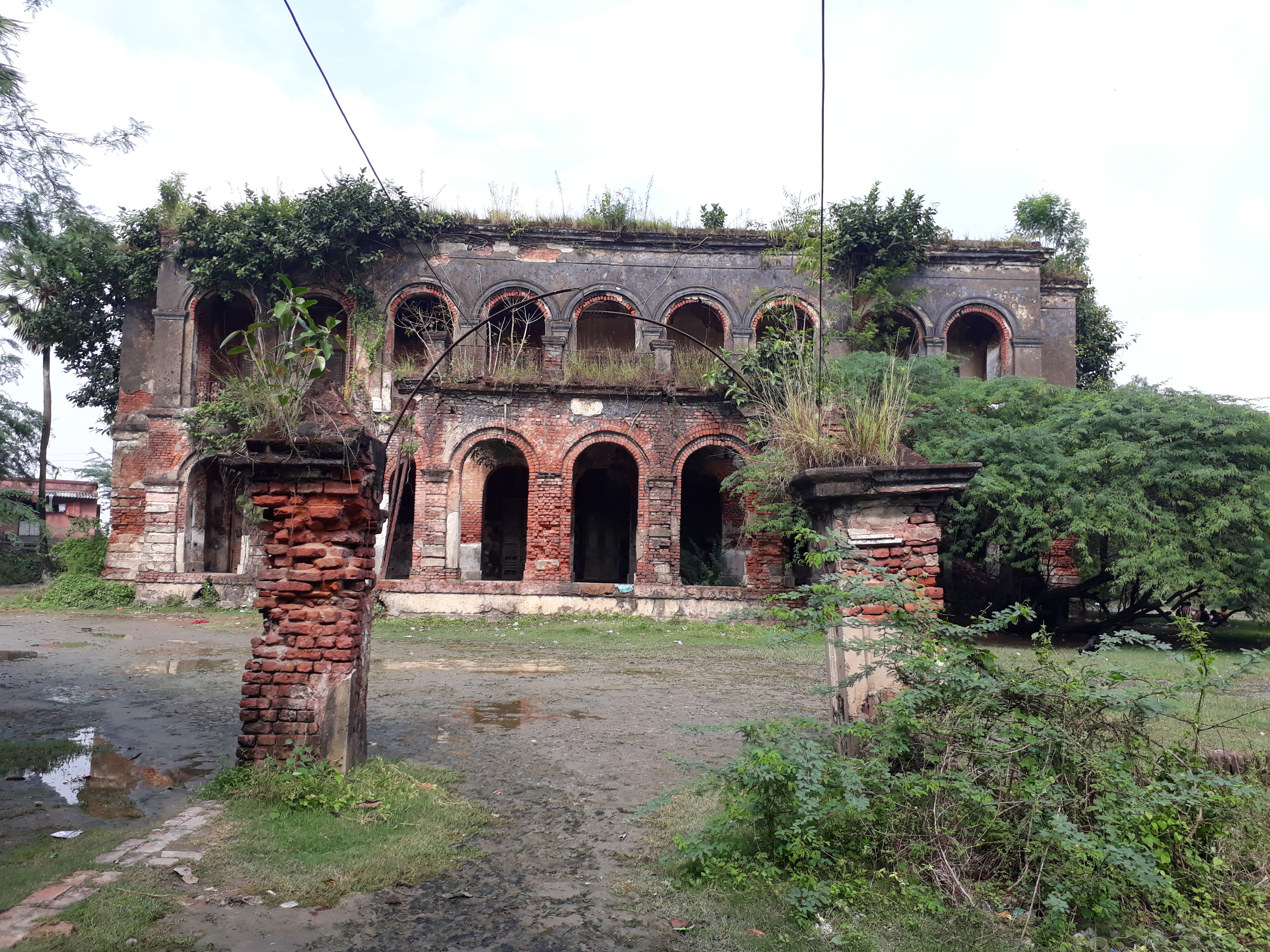
Port Canning Land, Investment, Reclamation and Dock Company Building or Hotel Kuthi

Lord Canning had wanted to build a port that would be an alternative to Kolkata and a rival to Singapore. What no one heeded were the warnings of a lowly shipping inspector Henry Piddington, who had lived in the Caribbean and knew all about hurricanes and storms. He wanted the mangroves to be left alone, as they were Bengal's defensive barrier against nature's fury and absorbed the initial onslaught of cyclonic winds, waves and tidal surges. The settlement was built with a strand, hotels and homes, but in 1867 the Matla River surged and reduced the town to a "bleached skeleton". Port Canning was closed in 1871–2, and government facilities withdrawn. Today, the Canning House, which probably served as the office of Canning Port still stands. It is in dilapidated condition and is a protected monument under West Bengal Heritage Commission.

In 1862, the Eastern Bengal Railway opened a southward line from what was then known as Beliaghata station to Port Canning. In the same year, the Eastern Bengal Railway had opened its line from Sealdah to Kushtia. The Eastern Bengal Railway was taken over by the government in 1887. Services on the eastern side of Hooghly River were unified under the Eastern Bengal State Railway and after further amalgamation in 1942, the Bengal Assam Railway.

== Geography ==
Places in Canning subdivision (Canning I & II, Basanti, Gosaba CD blocks) in South 24 Parganas district
R: rural/ urban centre
Places linked with coastal activity are marked in blue
Owing to space constraints in the small map, the actual locations in a larger map may vary slightly

=== Area overview ===
Canning subdivision has a very low level of urbanization. Only 12.37% of the population lives in the urban areas and 87.63% lives in the rural areas. There are 8 census towns in Canning I CD block and only 2 in the rest of the subdivision. The entire district is situated in the Ganges Delta with numerous islands in the southern part of the region. The area (shown in the map below) borders on the Sundarbans National Park and a major portion of it is a part of the Sundarbans settlements. It is a flat low-lying area in the South Bidyadhari plains. The Matla River is prominent and there are many streams and water channels locally known as khals. A comparatively recent country-wide development is the guarding of the coastal areas with special a coastal force.

Note: The map below presents some of the notable locations in the subdivision. All places marked in the map are linked in the larger full screen map.

=== Location ===
Canning is located at 22°18′50″N 88°39′54″E. It has an average elevation of 6 metres (20 ft).

Canning is the gateway of the Sundarbans. It is situated on the western banks of the Matla River. One can cross the Matla River and then proceed to Basanti for a boat to the interior of the Sundarbans or hire a motor launch for travel to Sundarbans at the town itself. The first watch tower at Sajnekhali is about 5 hours away.

=== Climate ===
Köppen-Geiger climate classification system classifies its climate as tropical wet and dry (Aw).

The overall climate of Canning is humid and warm. In summer, the maximum temperature goes 35 °C while in mild winters, minimum temperature drops 14 °C. The highest temperature ever was 42.5 °C, recorded on 17 May 1987. The lowest temperature ever dropped was 7.6 °C, dropped on 30 January 2007. The mean annual temperature is 26.5 °C. Average annual rainfall is approximately 1850 mm, 85 days feel the rain. Air is humid throughout the year, the amount is 77%.

Climate data for Canning (1991–2020, extremes 1980–2020)
Month	Jan	Feb	Mar	Apr	May	Jun	Jul	Aug	Sep	Oct	Nov	Dec	Year
Record high °C (°F)	32.0 (89.6)	38.0 (100.4)	40.6 (105.1)	42.2 (108.0)	42.5 (108.5)	40.6 (105.1)	38.8 (101.8)	38.5 (101.3)	37.0 (98.6)	36.2 (97.2)	33.6 (92.5)	32.0 (89.6)	42.5 (108.5)
Mean daily maximum °C (°F)	25.4 (77.7)	29.5 (85.1)	33.6 (92.5)	35.5 (95.9)	35.6 (96.1)	34.3 (93.7)	32.6 (90.7)	32.3 (90.1)	32.4 (90.3)	32.0 (89.6)	29.9 (85.8)	26.8 (80.2)	31.7 (89.1)
Mean daily minimum °C (°F)	13.2 (55.8)	17.1 (62.8)	22.0 (71.6)	25.2 (77.4)	26.6 (79.9)	27.0 (80.6)	26.7 (80.1)	26.7 (80.1)	26.4 (79.5)	24.6 (76.3)	19.4 (66.9)	14.6 (58.3)	22.4 (72.3)
Record low °C (°F)	7.0 (44.6)	9.8 (49.6)	13.4 (56.1)	16.6 (61.9)	18.0 (64.4)	17.5 (63.5)	21.2 (70.2)	22.4 (72.3)	22.5 (72.5)	18.2 (64.8)	12.4 (54.3)	8.5 (47.3)	7.0 (44.6)
Average rainfall mm (inches)	16.0 (0.63)	24.7 (0.97)	28.0 (1.10)	59.3 (2.33)	142.0 (5.59)	284.7 (11.21)	410.4 (16.16)	379.6 (14.94)	310.1 (12.21)	170.3 (6.70)	37.8 (1.49)	6.1 (0.24)	1,869 (73.58)
Average rainy days	1.2	1.4	1.6	3.5	7.0	13.0	18.0	17.2	13.4	6.3	1.3	0.6	84.5
Average relative humidity (%) (at 17:30 IST)	68	61	60	69	74	80	84	85	87	83	77	74	75
Source: India Meteorological Department

== Demographics ==
Canning is not identified as a separate place in the 2011 census records. The map of the CD block Canning I on the page number 333 in the District Census Handbook 2011 for the South 24 Parganas district shows Canning as being a part of the Matla and Dighirpar census towns.

== Civic administration ==
=== Police stations ===
Canning police station covers an area of 204.34 km^{2} (78.90 sq mi). It has jurisdiction over parts of the Canning I and Canning II CD blocks.

Canning women police station has jurisdiction over parts of the Canning I and Canning II CD blocks.

=== CD block HQ ===
The headquarters of the Canning I CD block are located at Canning.

== Economy ==
The District Human Development Report, South 24 Parganas, writes, "Canning has emerged as a major market for supply of fish to Kolkata. The fishermen of the area bring their catch to the all-night fish market at Canning. Here the commission agents receive the fish and auction them. It is bought by the wholesalers and transported to Kolkata for sale to retailers, who sell it in different markets. However, as greater part of Kolkata’s fish now come from South India and Madhya Pradesh, local wholesale trade at Canning has lost out in the competition. There is, of course, scope of reviving this market once again".

In 1980–81, Canning produced 332.5 tonnes of fresh domestic fish and 60.2 tonnes of exportable prawns. While the exportable prawns were despatched to processors at Kolkata, 59% of the fresh domestic fish was sent to markets in Kolkata.

As of 2019, the daily demand in the Kolkata fish market is around 550 tonnes. Andhra Pradesh-Telangana-Odisha supplies around 150 tonnes and the balance 400 tonnes is local supply from around Kolkata.

== Transport ==
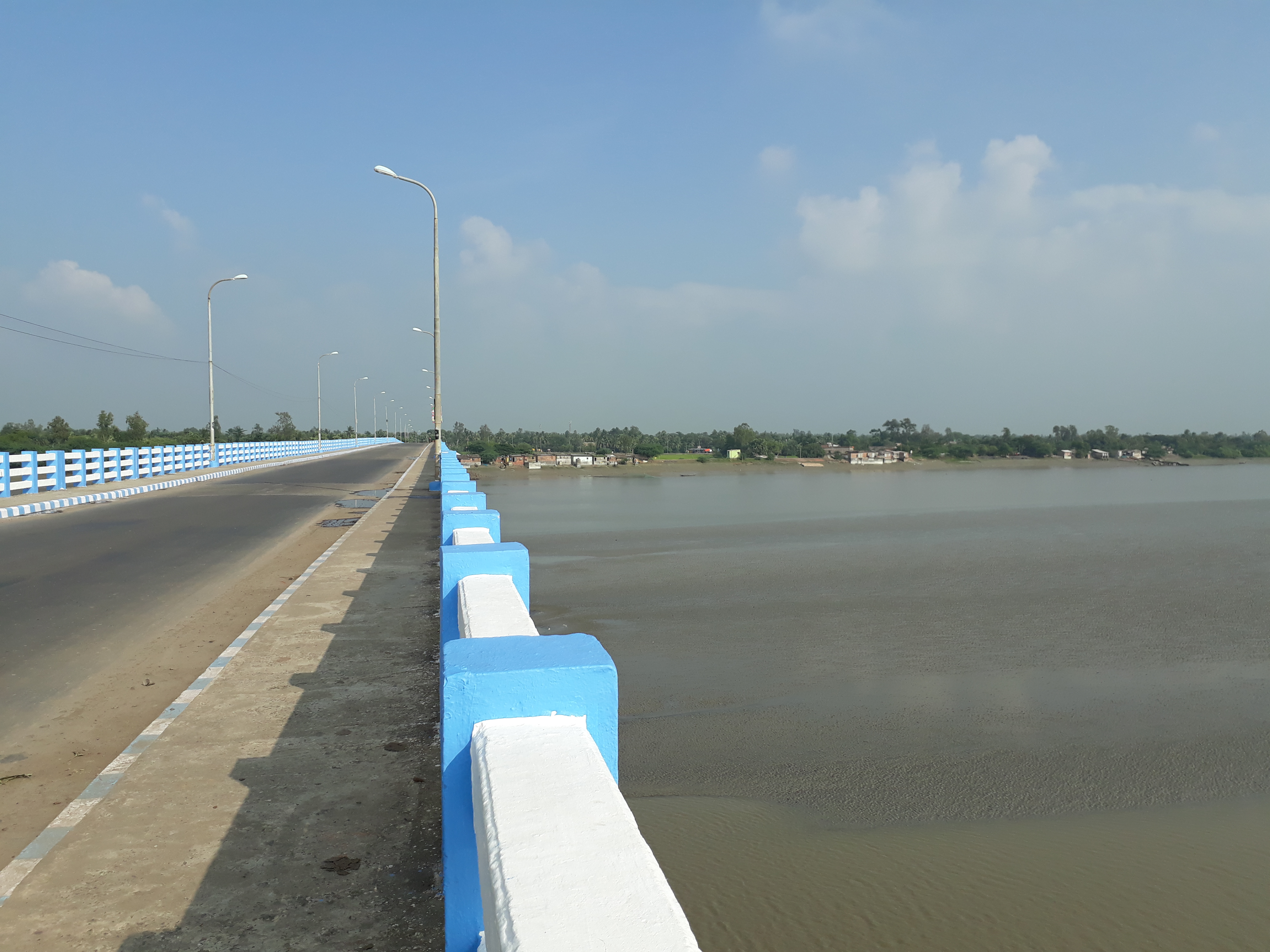
Bridge on Matla river in Canning

- Canning-Basanti Highway Connector Road via Matla Bridge links Canning to the State Highway 3.
- Baruipur-Canning Road links Canning to the State Highway 1.
- Canning railway station and Matla railway station is on the Sealdah–Canning line of the Kolkata Suburban Railway system.

=== Commuters ===
With the electrification of the railways, suburban traffic has grown tremendously since the 1960s. As of 2005–06, more than 1.7 million (17 lakhs) commuters use the Kolkata Suburban Railway system daily. After the partition of India, refugees from East Pakistan/ Bangladesh had a strong impact on the development of urban areas in the periphery of Kolkata. The new immigrants depended on Kolkata for their livelihood, thus increasing the number of commuters. Eastern Railway runs 1,272 EMU trains daily.

== Education ==
=== Technical & Engineering Institutes ===
- Canning Government Polytechnic College: Located in Gourdaha, offering diplomas in Computer Science, Electrical Engineering, and Renewable Energy.
- Canning 1 Government ITI College: Located on the Baruipur-Canning Road.
- JLD College of Engineering & Management: Located on Canning Road in Belegachi, offering diplomas in engineering disciplines like Civil and Mechanical.

=== General Degree Colleges ===
- Bankim Sardar College, NACC A+ aggregated, established in 1955, is affiliated with the University of Calcutta.
- Jibantala Rokeya Mahavidyalaya: A government-aided college located in Jibantala (Canning II).
- Hari Har Mahavidyalay: Located in Banshra.

=== High Schools ===
- Canning David Sassoon High School is a Bengali-medium coeducational school. It was established in 1933 and has facilities for teaching from class V to class XII.
- Canning Dwarikanath Balika Vidyalaya Up High School is a Bengali-medium school for girls. It was established in 1936 and has facilities for teaching from class V to class XII.
- Raybaghini High School is a Bengali-medium coeducational school. It was established in 1949 and has facilities for teaching from class V to class XII.
- St. Gabrial High School is an English-medium school for boys. It was established in 1930 and has facilities for teaching from class V to class XII.
- St. Stephen's School, Canning: Located near the railway station in Canning Town.
- Ganti J P Memorial School: An English-medium school located near the rail gate in Bansra.
- Taldi Mohan Chand High School: Boys High school Located on Station Road near Taldi.
- Taldi Surabala Shikshayatan: Girls High school Located on Station Road near Taldi.

== Healthcare ==
Canning Subdivisional Hospital, with 100 beds, is the major government medical facility in the Canning subdivision.

== Notable people ==
- Gobinda Chandra Naskar
- Pratima Mondal
