= Jibantala =

- Village
- Location in West Bengal Location in India
- Coordinates: 22.4224°N 88.6649°E
- Country: India
- State: West Bengal
- District: South 24 Parganas
- CD block: Canning II

Area
  - Total: 1.40 km^{2} (0.54 sq mi)
- Elevation: 6 m (20 ft)

Population (2011)
  - Total: 2,355
  - Density: 1,680/km^{2} (4,360/sq mi)

Languages
  - Official: Bengali
  - Additional official: English
- Time zone: UTC+5:30 (IST)
- PIN: 743502
- Telephone code: +91 3218
- Vehicle registration: WB-19 to WB-22, WB-95 to WB-99
- Lok Sabha constituency: Jaynagar (SC)
- Vidhan Sabha constituency: Canning Purba
- Website: www.s24pgs.gov.in

Jibantala is a village within the jurisdiction of the Jibantala police station in the Canning II CD block in the Canning subdivision of the South 24 Parganas district in the Indian state of West Bengal.

== Geography ==
Places in Canning subdivision (Canning I & II, Basanti, Gosaba CD blocks) in South 24 Parganas district
R: rural/ urban centre
Places linked with coastal activity are marked in blue
Owing to space constraints in the small map, the actual locations in a larger map may vary slightly

=== Area overview ===
Canning subdivision has a very low level of urbanization. Only 12.37% of the population lives in the urban areas and 87.63% lives in the rural areas. There are 8 census towns in Canning I CD block and only 2 in the rest of the subdivision. The entire district is situated in the Ganges Delta with numerous islands in the southern part of the region. The area (shown in the map alongside) borders on the Sundarbans National Park and a major portion of it is a part of the Sundarbans settlements. It is a flat low-lying area in the South Bidyadhari plains. The Matla River is prominent and there are many streams and water channels locally known as khals. A comparatively recent country-wide development is the guarding of the coastal areas with a special coastal force.

Note: The map alongside presents some of the notable locations in the subdivision. All places marked in the map are linked in the larger full screen map.

=== Location ===
Jibantala is located at 22.4224°N 88.6649°E.

== Demographics ==
According to the 2011 Census of India, Jibantala had a total population of 2,355, of which 1,212 (51%) were males and 1,143 (49%) were females. There were 386 persons in the age range of 0 to 6 years. The total number of literate persons in Jibantala was 1.228 (62.37% of the population over 6 years).

== Civic administration ==
=== Police station ===
Jibantala police station was established on 28 August 2010. It covers an area of 238.93 km^{2} spread over part of the Canning I CD block and full Canning II CD block.

== Social scenario ==
According to the District Human Development Report for the South 24 Parganas, "The district is typically at the lower rung of the ladder in terms of district per capita income compared to other districts of West Bengal… This place also houses the largest proportion of backward people compared to the state… So far as the crime scenario is concerned the economically weaker group, i.e. the women and children, suffer the most in this district."

== Transport ==
Jibantala stands at the crossing of the Bodra-Jibantala Road and the Jibantala-Taldi Road.

== Education ==
Jibantala Rokeya Mahavidyalaya was established at Jibantala in 2001. Affiliated to the University of Calcutta it offers honours courses in Bengali, English, Sanskrit, history, political science, philosophy and education, and general courses in BA and B Sc.

Jawahar Navodaya Vidyalaya, South 24 Parganas, at Jibantala, is a coeducational boarding school, established in 2009. It is affiliated with the Central Board of Secondary Education and provides schooling from class VI to class XII. Jawahar Navodaya Vidyalayas are funded by the Ministry of Human Resources Development, Government of India, and administered by the Navodaya Vidyalaya Samiti, an autonomous body under the ministry. These schools offer free high-quality education, boarding and lodging, books and other school requirements to meritorious students belonging to SC/ST and below poverty line families. Meritorious children of government employees and other categories can also apply but are charged certain fees. Students are admitted on the basis of an admission test.

Howrahmari High School is a Bengali-medium coeducational institution established in 1975. It has facilities for teaching from class V to class XII.

Iswaripur Marjina Vidyaniketan is a higher secondary institution.

== Healthcare ==
Matherdighi Rural Hospital, with 30 beds, at Matherdighi, is the major government medical facility in the Canning II CD block.
