= Canning Paschim Assembly constituency =

Constituency of the West Bengal Legislative Assembly, in India

Canning Paschim
- Constituency No. 138 for the West Bengal Legislative Assembly
- Interactive Map Outlining Canning Paschim Assembly Constituency

Constituency details
- Country: India
- Region: East India
- State: West Bengal
- District: South 24 Parganas
- Lok Sabha constituency: Jaynagar
- Established: 1957
- Total electors: 257,552
- Reservation: SC

Member of Legislative Assembly
- 18th West Bengal Legislative Assembly
- Incumbent Paresh Ram Das
- Party: AITC
- Alliance: AITC+
- Elected year: 2026

Canning Paschim Assembly constituency is a Legislative Assembly constituency of South 24 Parganas district in the Indian State of West Bengal. It is reserved for Scheduled Castes.

== Overview ==
As per order of the Delimitation Commission in respect of the Delimitation of constituencies in the West Bengal, Canning Paschim Assembly constituency is composed of the following:

- Canning I community development block
- Narayanpur gram panchayat of Canning II community development block

Canning Paschim Assembly constituency is a part of No. 19 Jaynagar Lok Sabha constituency.

== Members of the Legislative Assembly ==
Year	Name	Party
1977	Chittaranjan Mirdha	Communist Party of India (Marxist)
1982	Chittaranjan Mirdha	Communist Party of India (Marxist)
1987	Gobinda Chandra Naskar	Indian National Congress
1991	Bimal Mistry	Communist Party of India (Marxist)
1996	Bimal Mistry	Communist Party of India (Marxist)
2001	Gobinda Chandra Naskar	Trinamool Congress
2006	Dwijapada Mondal	Communist Party of India (Marxist)
2011	Shyamal Mondal	Trinamool Congress
2016	Shyamal Mondal	Trinamool Congress
2021	Paresh Ram Das	Trinamool Congress
2026	Paresh Ram Das	Trinamool Congress

== Election results ==
=== 2026 ===
2026 West Bengal Legislative Assembly election: Canning Paschim
Party	Candidate	Votes	%	±%
AITC	Paresh Ram Das	120,548	52.26	▲1.40
BJP	Prasanta Bayen	79,883	34.63	▼0.09
ISF	Prabir Mondal	23,908	10.36	
NOTA	None of the above	2,368	1.03	▼0.36
Majority		40,665	17.63	▲1.49
Turnout		230,686	96.79	▲12.05
AITC hold		Swing		

=== 2021 ===
2021 West Bengal Legislative Assembly election: Canning Paschim
Party	Candidate	Votes	%	±%
AITC	Paresh Ram Das	111,059	50.86	▲1.77
BJP	Arnab Roy	75,816	34.72	▲28.07
Independent	Meghnath Halder	13,390	6.13	
INC	Pratap Mondal	11,908	5.45	▼33.8
NOTA	None of the above	3,032	1.39	
Majority		35,243	16.14	
Turnout		218,354	84.74	
AITC hold		Swing		

=== 2016 ===
2016 West Bengal Legislative Assembly election: Canning Paschim
Party	Candidate	Votes	%	±%
AITC	Shyamal Mondal	93,498	49.08	▼4.27
INC	Arnab Roy	74,772	39.25	New entry
BJP	Manojit Mondal	12,664	6.65	▲2.66
SUCI(C)	Ramprasad Mistry	3,980	2.09	New entry
NOTA	None of the above	2,469	1.29	New entry
BSP	Swadesh Sanfui	1,827	0.96	▼1.15
Independent	Debasis Sani	1,315	0.69	New entry
Majority		18,726	9.83	▼2.97
Turnout		1,90,517	85.66	▼0.48
AITC hold		Swing		

=== 2011 ===
2011 West Bengal Legislative Assembly election: Canning Paschim
Party	Candidate	Votes	%	±%
AITC	Shyamal Mondal	81,736	53.35	
CPI(M)	Jaydeb Purkait	62,122	40.55	
BJP	Manojit Mondal	6,108	3.99	
BSP	Ajit Kumar Majumdar	3,236	2.11	
Majority		19,614	12.80	
Turnout		1,53,202	86.14	
AITC gain from CPI(M)		Swing		

=== 2006 ===
In 2006, Dwijapada Mondal of CPI(M) won the Canning Paschim Assembly constituency defeating his nearest rival, Gobinda Chandra Naskar of AITC. In 2001, Gobinda Chandra Naskar of AITC defeated Bimal Mistry of CPI(M). Bimal Mistry of CPI(M) defeated Bhaskar Sinha of INC in 1996 and 1991. Gobinda Chandra Naskar of INC defeated Chittaranjan Mirdha of CPI(M) in 1987. Chittaranjan Mirdha of CPI(M) defeated Gobinda Chandra Naskar of INC in 1982 and 1977.

=== 1972 ===
Gobinda Chandra Naskar of INC won the Canning Assembly constituency in 1972 and 1971. Narayan Naskar of INC won in 1969. A.C.Halder of Bangla Congress won in 1967. Khagendra Nath Naskar of INC won in 1962. In 1957, Canning Assembly constituency had joint seats. Khagendra Nath Naskar and Abdus Shukur, both of INC, won. The seat did not exist prior to that.
