= Matla River =

River in India

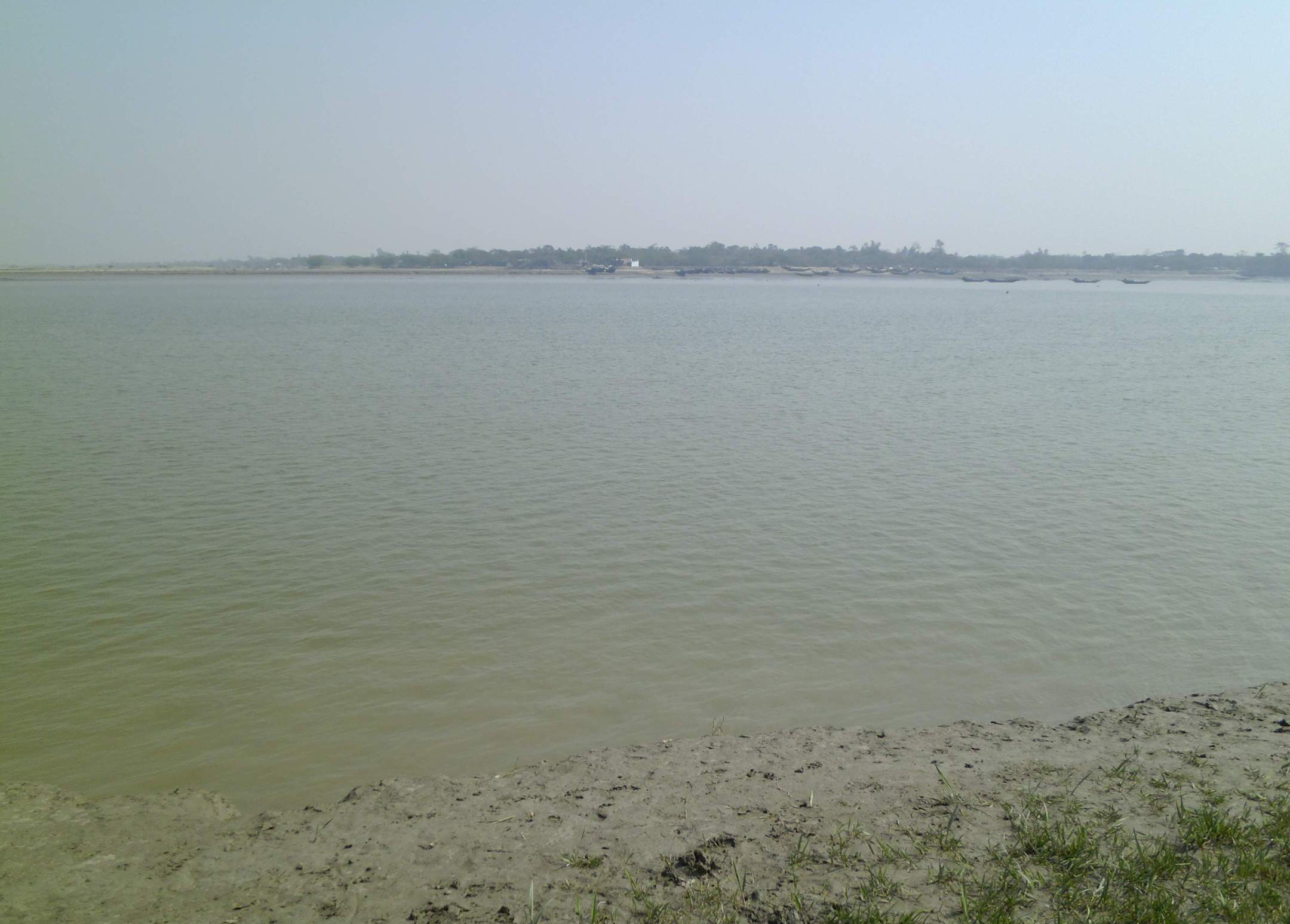
- Matla River (Canning)

Location
- Country: India
- State: West Bengal
- District: South 24 Parganas

Physical characteristics
- Discharge
  - location: Bidyadhari River

Matla River forms a wide estuary in and around the Sundarbans in South 24 Parganas district in the Indian state of West Bengal.

The main stream of the Matla River is divided into two arms near Purandar. One passes through Kultali-Garanbose and then passes through the Sundarbans. The other passes through Basanti, Pathankhali, Surjyaberia, Masjidbati and then meets Bidyadhari River.

Lateral connections of the Matla system on the west are Belladonna River, Kultala River, the Piyali-Nabipukur River, the Bainchapi Khal, the Kaikalmari River, the Suia River, the Dulibhasani Gang, and the Gokhaltali Gang, On the eastern side the main connections with the Gosaba and Raimangal systems are more intricate and many of the channels are yet to be named. The important channels in this belt are Rupkhali Khal, Pathankhali Nadi, Pirkhali Nadi, Gazikhali Khal, Panchmukhani Khal, Mayanadi Khal, Mayadip River, Bhangaduni River, Kalindi River, Kalgachia River, Raimangal River, Jhilla River, Gonna River, and the Harinbhanga River.

An abortive attempt was made to establish Port Canning on the Matla in 1860s.

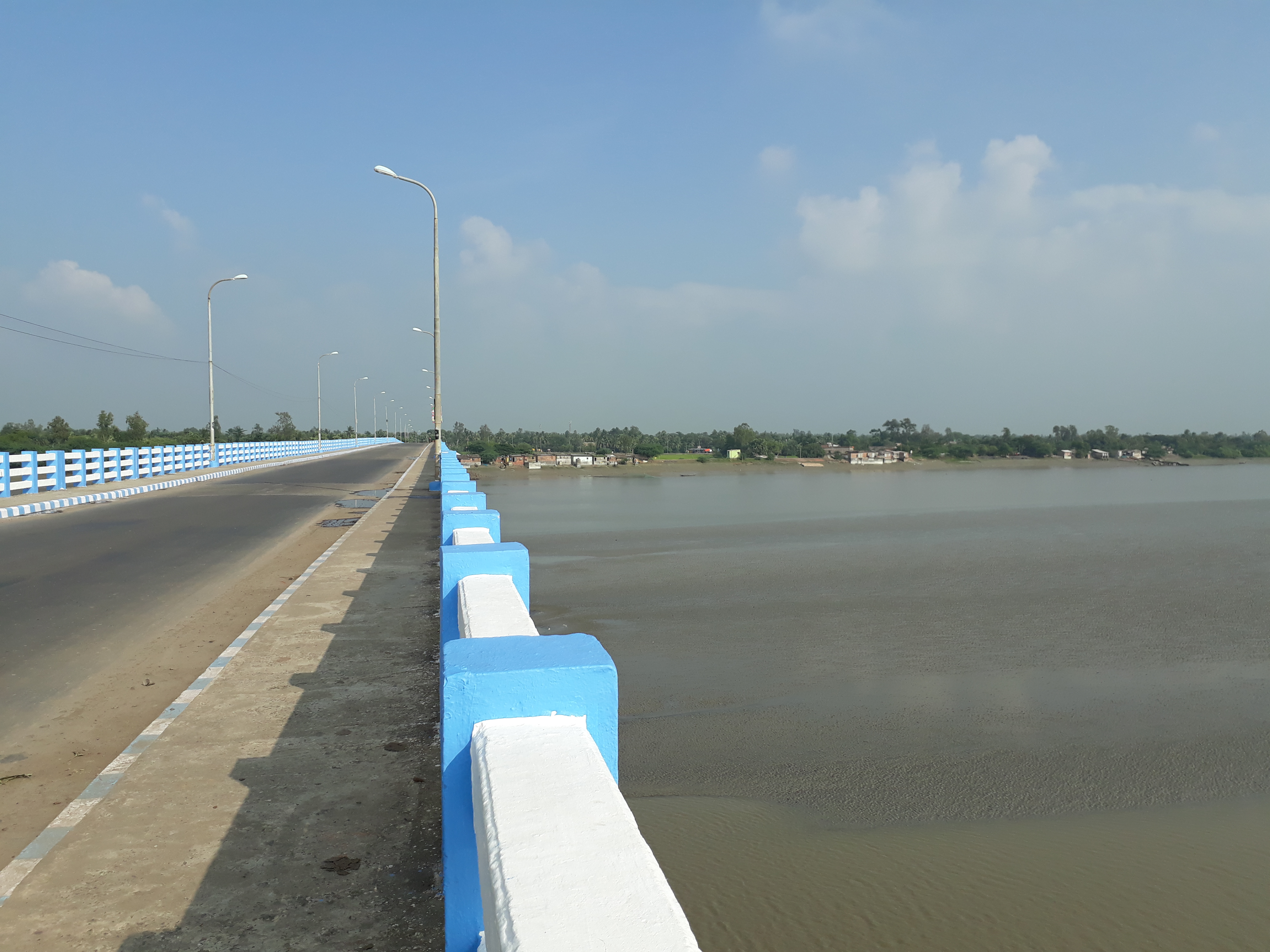
Bridge over the Matla river on the way of Canning to Jharkhali

About 300,000 pilgrims take a dip at the confluence of the Adi Ganga and Matla rivers at South Bishnupur village on Makar Sankranti day.

During the monsoons the Matla becomes so turbulent that it becomes impossible for boats to ferry people. At the same time, the Matla has become so silted that during the dry season boats cannot come near the jetties and have to be stationed 460 metres (500 yd) from the jetty. Long stretches of the Matla have embankments to protect villages in the surrounding areas from flooding.

A 644-metre (2,113 ft) road bridge across the Matla, was inaugurated by Buddhadeb Bhattacharjee, former Chief Minister of West Bengal, in January 2011. It links Canning with Basanti. The bridge is located at 22°18′20″N 88°40′46″E.

== Gallery ==
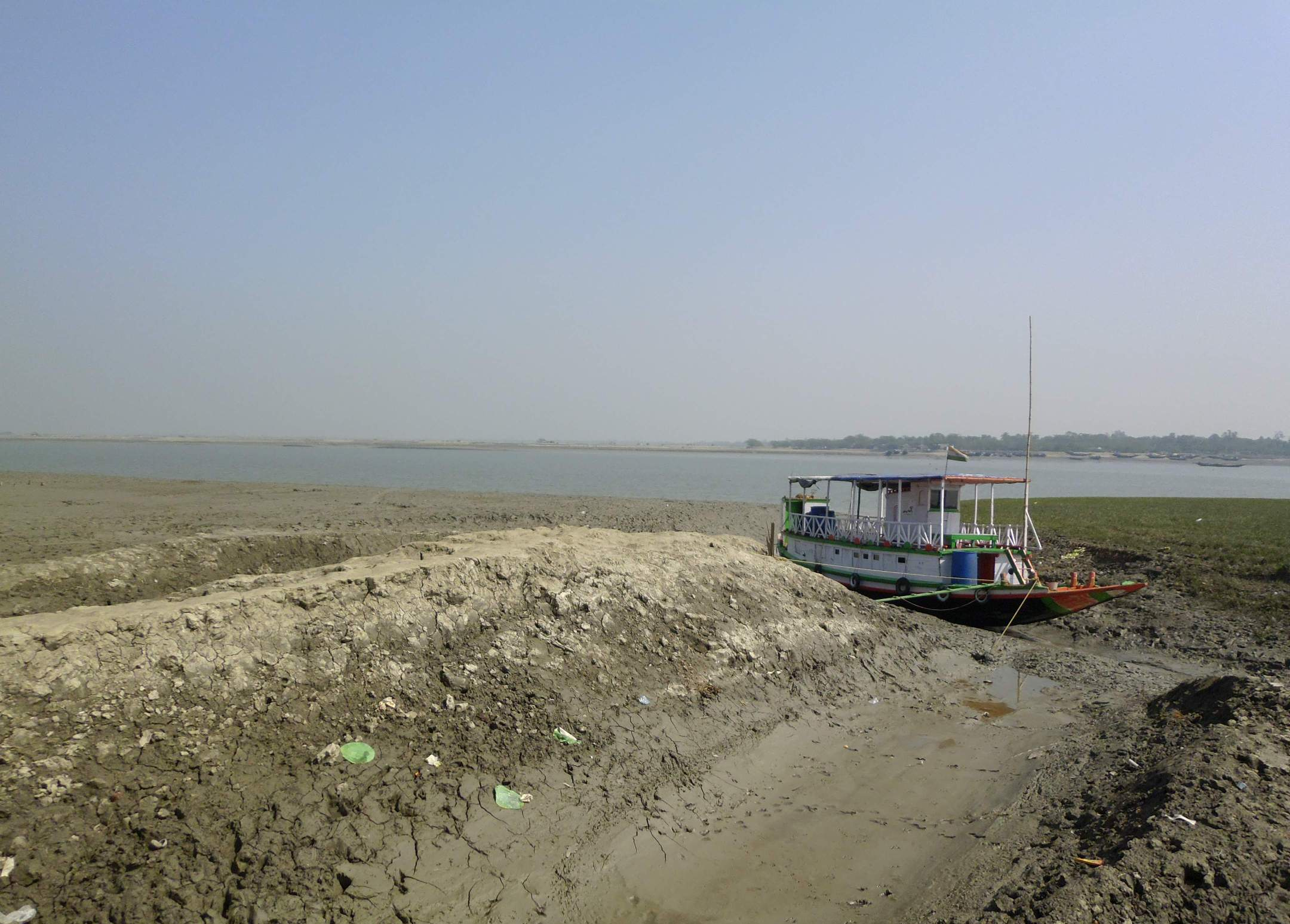
Matla River (Canning)

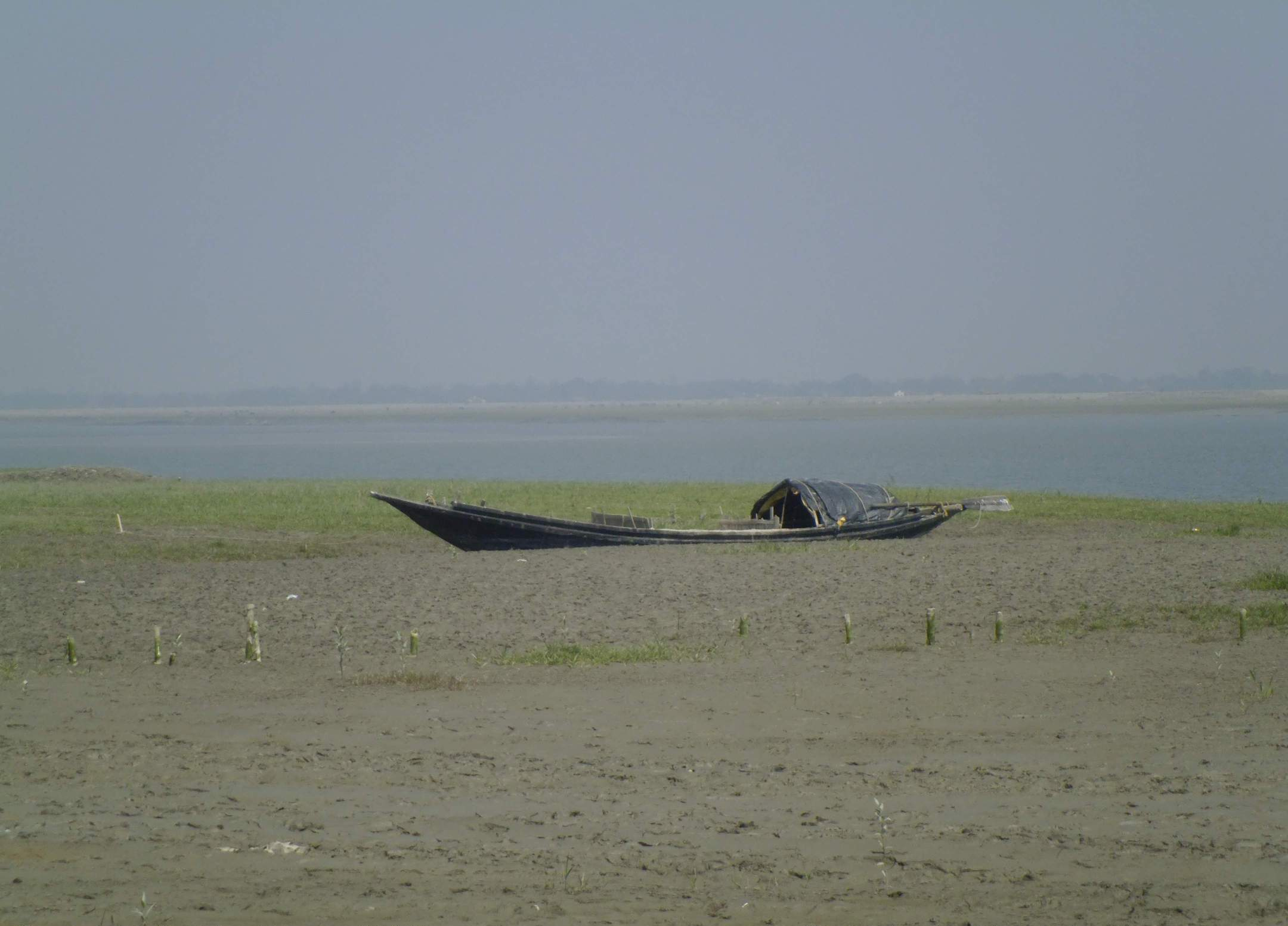
Matla River (Canning)

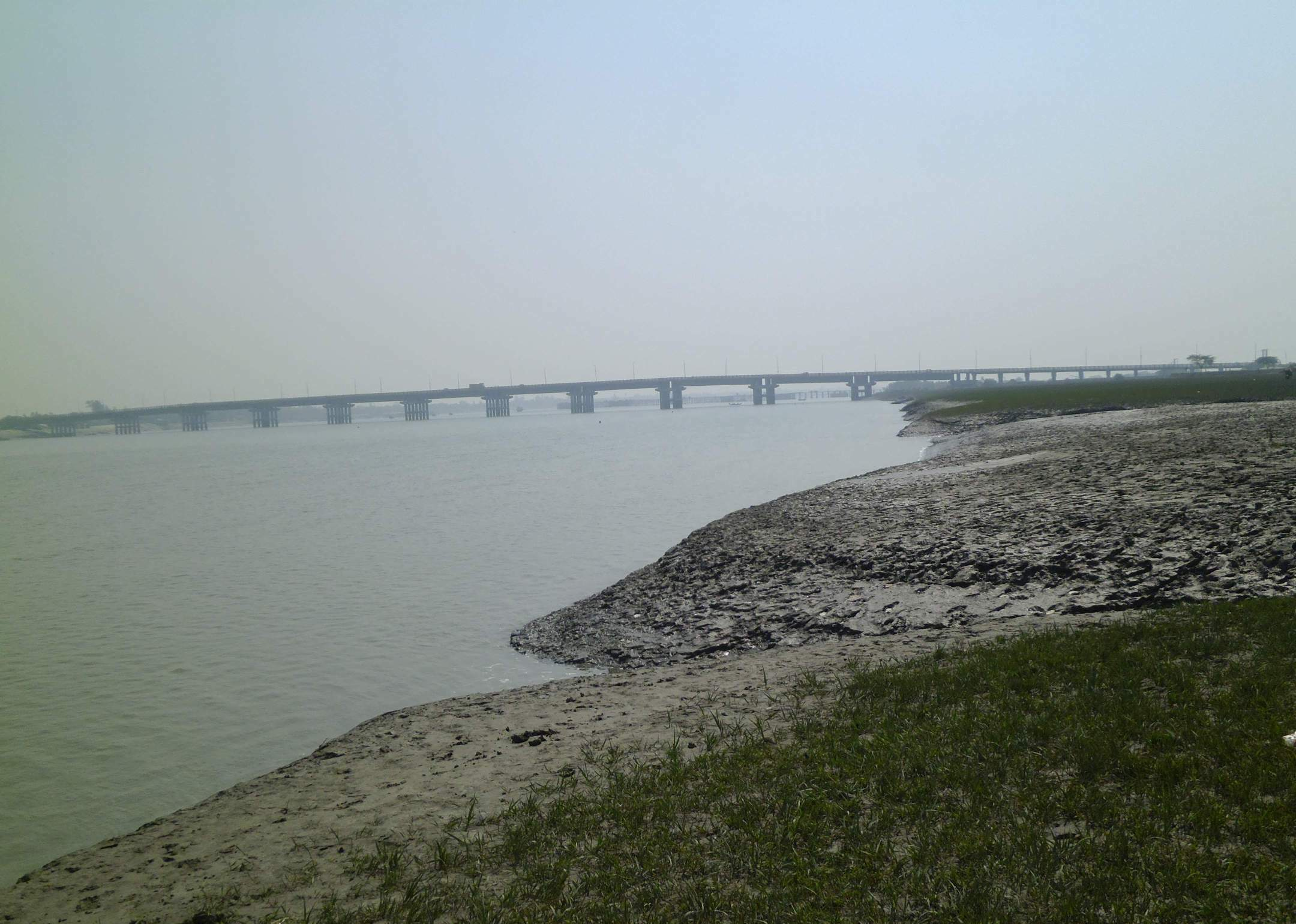
Bridge on Matla River

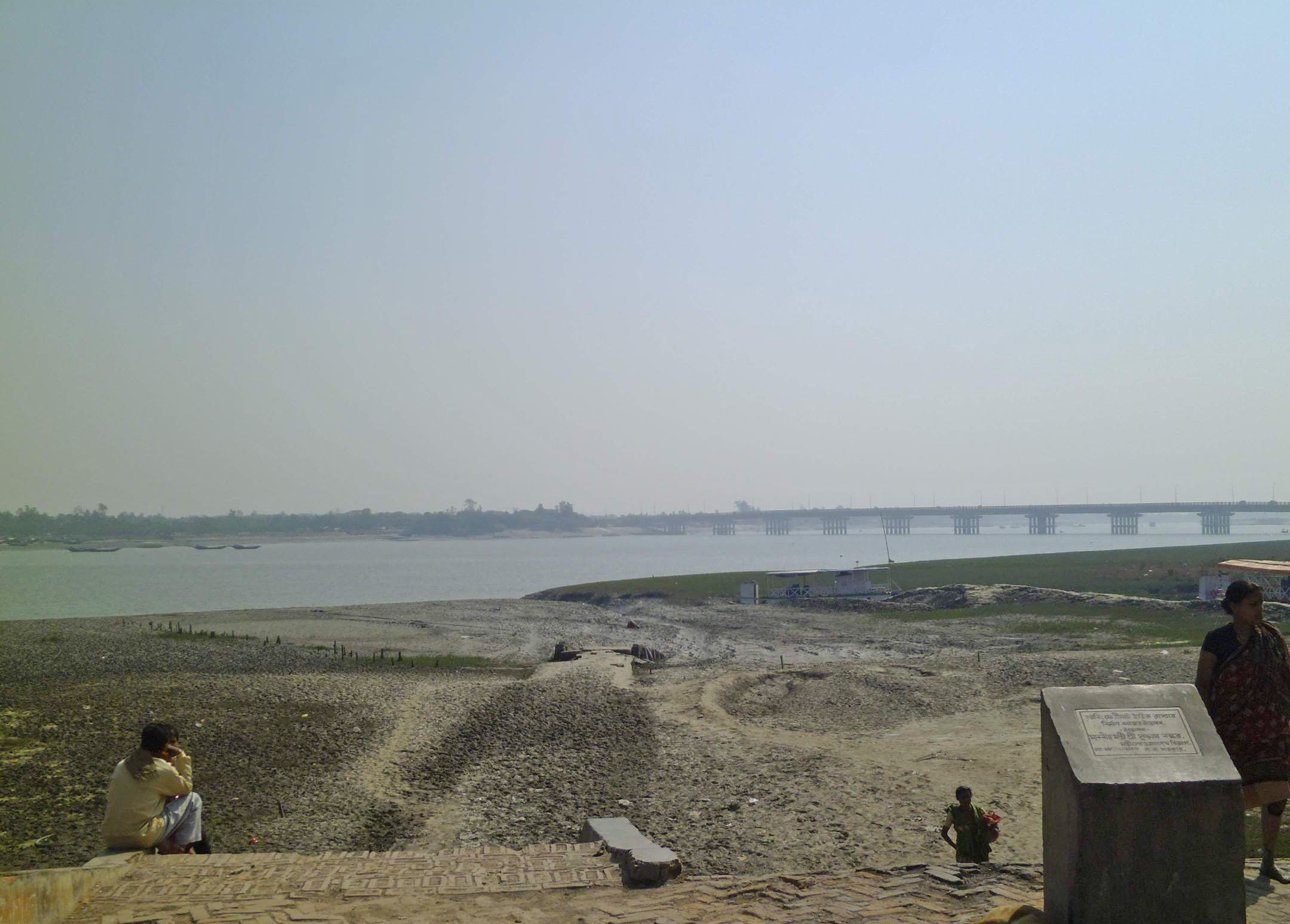
Matla River Full View
