= Kulpi (community development block) =

Community Development Block in West Bengal, India

- Community Development Block
- Location of Kulpi community development block in South 24 Parganas district
- Coordinates: 22.0815°N 88.2449°E
- Country: India
- State: West Bengal
- Division: Presidency
- District: South 24 Parganas
- Subdivision: Diamond Harbour
- Headquarters: Kulpi

Government
  - Gram Panchayats: Baburmahal, Belpukur, Chandipur, Dhola, Gajipur, Iswaripur, Kamarchak, Karanjali, Keoratala, Kulpi, Rajarampur, Ramkishore, Ramkrishnapur, Ramnagar Gazipur
  - Lok Sabha constituencies: Mathurapur
  - Vidhan Sabha constituencies: Kulpi

Area
  - Total: 210.83 km^{2} (81.40 sq mi)

Population (2011)
  - Total: 283,197
  - Density: 1,343.2/km^{2} (3,479.0/sq mi)
  - Urban: 16,552

Demographics
  - Literacy: 75.49 per cent
  - Sex ratio: 956 ♂/♀

Languages
  - Official: Bengali
  - Additional official: English
- Time zone: UTC+05:30 (IST)
- Website: s24pgs.gov.in

Kulpi is a community development block that forms an administrative division in Diamond Harbour subdivision of South 24 Parganas district in the Indian state of West Bengal.

== History ==
Harinarayanpur is an archaeological site in this CD block.

== Geography ==

Kulpi CD block is located at 22°04′53″N 88°14′42″E. It has an average elevation of 6 metres (20 ft).

Kulpi CD block is bounded by Diamond Harbour I and Magrahat I CD blocks in the north, Mandirbazar, Mathurapur I and Patharpratima CD blocks in east, Kakdwip CD block in the south, Haldia and Sutahata CD blocks in Purba Medinipur district, across the Hooghly, in the west.

South 24 Parganas district is divided into two distinct physiographic zones: the marine-riverine delta in the north and the marine delta zone in the south. As the sea receded southwards, in the sub-recent geological period, a large low-lying plain got exposed. Both tidal inflows and the rivers have been depositing sediments in this plain. The periodical collapse of both the natural levees and man-made embankments speed up the process of filling up of the depressions containing brackish water wetlands. The marine delta in the south is formed of interlacing tidal channels. As non-saline water for irrigation is scarce, agriculture is monsoon dominated. Some parts of the wetlands are still preserved for raising fish.

Kulpi CD block has an area of 210.83 km^{2}. It has 1 panchayat samity, 14 gram panchayats, 195 gram sansads (village councils), 182 mouzas and 172 inhabited villages, as per the District Statistical Handbook, South Twenty-four Parganas. Kulpi and Dholahat police stations serve this CD Block. Headquarters of this CD block is at Kulpi.

Gram panchayats of Kulpi CD block/panchayat samiti are: Baburmahal, Belpukur, Chandipur, Dhola, Gajipur, Iswaripur, Kamarchak, Karanjali, Keoratala, Kulpi, Rajarampur, Ramkishore, Ramkrishnapur and Ramnagar Gazipur.

== Demographics ==
=== Population ===
As per the 2011 Census of India, Kulpi CD block had a total population of 283,197, of which 266,645 were rural and 16,552 were urban. There were 144,773 (51%) males and 138,424 (49%) females. Population below 6 years was 39,378. Scheduled Castes numbered 84,020 (29.67%) and Scheduled Tribes numbered 315 (0.11%).

As per the 2001 Census of India, Kulpi CD block had a total population of 242,760, out of which 124,825 were males and 117,935 were females. Kulpi CD block registered a population growth of 14.70 per cent during the 1991-2001 decade. Decadal growth for South 24 Parganas district was 20.89 per cent. Decadal growth in West Bengal was 17.84 per cent. Scheduled Castes at 79,993 formed around one-third the population. Scheduled Tribes numbered 1,366.

Census Towns in Kulpi CD block (2011 census figures in brackets): Berandari Bagaria (10,748) and Dhola (5,804).

Large villages (with 4,000+ population) in Kulpi CD block (2011 census figures in brackets): Manoharpur (5,206), Karimnagar (5,443), Ishwaripur (4,427), Dakshin Akraberia (4,238), Chandipur (6,982), Durganagar (4,274), Arunnagar (4,604), Belpukuria (13,011) and Lakshmipur (23,956).

Other villages in Kulpi CD block include (2011 census figures in brackets): Kulpi (2,000), Uttar Gazipur (2,575) and Karanjali (3,400).

=== Literacy ===
As per the 2011 census, the total number of literates in Kulpi CD block was 184,054 (75.49% of the population over 6 years) out of which males numbered 102,033 (81.76% of the male population over 6 years) and females numbered 82,021 (68.91% of the female population over 6 years). The gender disparity (the difference between female and male literacy rates) was 12.85%.

As per the 2011 Census of India, literacy in South 24 Parganas district was 77.51 Literacy in West Bengal was 77.08% in 2011. Literacy in India in 2011 was 74.04%.

As per the 2001 Census of India, Kulpi CD block had a total literacy of 67.74 per cent for the 6+ age group. While male literacy was 79.15 per cent female literacy was 55.59 per cent. South 24 Parganas district had a total literacy of 69.45 per cent, male literacy being 79.19 per cent and female literacy being 59.01 per cent.

See also – List of West Bengal districts ranked by literacy rate

Literacy in CD blocks of
South 24 Parganas district
Alipore Sadar subdivision
Bishnupur I – 78.33%
Bishnupur II – 81.37%
Budge Budge I – 80.57%
Budge Budge II – 79.13%
Thakurpukur Maheshtala – 83.54%
Baruipur subdivision
Baruipur – 76.46%
Bhangar I – 72.06%
Bhangar II – 74.49%
Jaynagar I – 73.17%
Jaynagar II – 69.71%
Kultali – 69.37%
Sonarpur – 79.70%
Canning subdivision
Basanti – 68.32%
Canning I – 70.76%
Canning II – 66.51%
Gosaba – 78.98%
Diamond Harbour subdivision
Diamond Harbour I – 75.72%
Diamond Harbour II – 76.91%
Falta – 77.17%
Kulpi – 75.49%
Magrahat I – 73.82%
Magrahat II – 77.41%
Mandirbazar – 75.89%
Mathurapur I – 73.93%
Mathurapur II – 77.77%
Kakdwip subdivision
Kakdwip – 77.93%
Namkhana – 85.72
Patharpratima – 82.11%
Sagar – 84.21%
Source: 2011 Census: CD Block Wise
Primary Census Abstract Data

=== Language ===
Languages of Kulpi CD block (2011)
1. Bengali (99.5%)
2. Hindi (0.42%)
3. Urdu (0.02%)
4. Others (0.01%)

At the time of the 2011 census, 99.55% of the population spoke Bengali, 0.42% Hindi and 0.02% Urdu as their first language.

=== Religion ===
Religion in Kulpi CD block (2011)
Hinduism	60.01%
Islam	38.90%
Christianity	0.42%
Other or not stated	0.11%

In the 2011 Census of India, Hindus numbered 172,726 and formed 60.01% of the population in Kulpi CD block. Muslims numbered 114,964 and formed 38.90% of the population. Others numbered 1,507 and formed 0.53% of the population. Amongst the others, Christians numbered 1,186. In 2001, Hindus were 63.22% of the population, while Muslims and Christians were 36.35% and 0.39% of the population respectively.

The proportion of Hindus in South Twenty-four Parganas district has declined from 76.0% in 1961 to 63.2% in 2011. The proportion of Muslims in South Twenty-four Parganas district has increased from 23.4% to 35.6% during the same period. Christians formed 0.8% in 2011.

== Rural poverty ==
As per the Human Development Report for South 24 Parganas district, published in 2009, in Kulpi CD block the percentage of households below poverty line was 52.64%, a high level of poverty, next only to 64.89% of Basanti CD block and close to 50.32% of Canning II CD block. In the north-east and mid central portion of the district, all CD blocks, with the exception of Kulpi CD block, had poverty rates below 30%. As per rural household survey in 2005, the proportion of households in South 24 Parganas with poverty rates below poverty line was 34.11%, way above the state and national poverty ratios. The poverty rates were very high in the Sundarbans settlements with all thirteen CD blocks registering poverty ratios above 30% and eight CD blocks had more than 40% of the population in the BPL category.

== Economy ==
=== Livelihood ===
Livelihood
in Kulpi CD block
1. Cultivators (9.17%)
2. Agricultural labourers (37.8%)
3. Household industries (8.92%)
4. Other Workers (44.1%)

In Kulpi CD block in 2011, amongst the class of total workers, cultivators numbered 8,586 and formed 9.17%, agricultural labourers numbered 35,411 and formed 37.82%, household industry workers numbered 8,351 and formed 8.92% and other workers numbered 41,294 and formed 44.10%. Total workers numbered 93,642 and formed 33.07% of the total population, and non-workers numbered 189,555 and formed 66.93% of the population.

The District Human Development Report points out that in the blocks of region situated in the close proximity of the Kolkata metropolis, overwhelming majority are involved in the non-agricultural sector for their livelihood. On the other hand, in the Sundarban region, overwhelming majority are dependent on agriculture. In the intermediate region, there is again predominance of the non-agricultural sector. Though the region is not very close to Kolkata, many places are well connected and some industrial/ economic development has taken place.

Note: In the census records a person is considered a cultivator, if the person is engaged in cultivation/ supervision of land owned by self/government/institution. When a person who works on another person's land for wages in cash or kind or share, is regarded as an agricultural labourer. Household industry is defined as an industry conducted by one or more members of the family within the household or village, and one that does not qualify for registration as a factory under the Factories Act. Other workers are persons engaged in some economic activity other than cultivators, agricultural labourers and household workers. It includes factory, mining, plantation, transport and office workers, those engaged in business and commerce, teachers, entertainment artistes and so on.

=== Infrastructure ===
There are 172 inhabited villages in Kulpi CD block, as per the District Census Handbook, South Twenty-four Parganas, 2011. 100% villages have power supply. 171 villages (90.42%) have drinking water supply. 31 villages (18.02%) have post offices. 141 villages (81.98%) have telephones (including landlines, public call offices and mobile phones). 38 villages (22.09%) have pucca (paved) approach roads and 64 villages (37.21%) have transport communication (includes bus service, rail facility and navigable waterways). 4 villages (2.23%) have agricultural credit societies and 10 villages (5.81%) have banks.

=== Agriculture ===
South 24 Parganas had played a significant role in the Tebhaga movement launched by the Communist Party of India in 1946.Subsequently, Operation Barga was aimed at securing tenancy rights for the peasants. In Kulpi CD block, 3,855.09 acres of land was acquired and vested. Out of this 1,187.58 acres or 30.81% of the vested land was distributed. The total number of patta (document) holders was 4,769.

According to the District Human Development Report, agriculture is an important source of livelihood in South Twentyfour Parganas district. The amount of cultivable land per agricultural worker is only 0.41 hectare in the district. Moreover, the irrigation facilities have not been extended to a satisfactory scale. Agriculture mostly remains a mono-cropped activity.

As per the District Census Handbook, the saline soil of the district is unfit for cultivation, but the non-salty lands are very fertile. While rice is the main food crop, jute is the main cash crop.

In 2013-14, there were 79 fertiliser depots, 22 seed stores and 56 fair price shops in Kulpi CD block.

In 2013–14, Kulpi CD block produced 2,845 tonnes of Aman paddy, the main winter crop, from 1,561 hectares, 8,031 tonnes of Boro paddy (spring crop) from 2,059 hectares. It also produced pulses and oilseeds.

=== Pisciculture ===
In Kulpi CD block, in 2013-14, net area under effective pisciculture was 1,950 hectares, engaging 21,547 persons in the profession, and with an approximate annual production of 7,670 quintals.

Pisciculture is an important source of employment in South 24 Parganas district. As of 2001, more than 4.5 lakh people were engaged in Pisciculture. Out of this 2.57 lakhs were from the 13 blocks in the Sundarbans settlements.

=== Banking ===
In 2013-14, Kulpi CD block had offices of 8 commercial banks.

=== Backward Regions Grant Fund ===
South 24 Parganas district is listed as a backward region and receives financial support from the Backward Regions Grant Fund. The fund, created by the Government of India, is designed to redress regional imbalances in development. As of 2012, 272 districts across the country were listed under this scheme. The list includes 11 districts of West Bengal.

== Transport ==
Kulpi CD block has 6 originating/ terminating bus routes.

Udairampur, Kulpi, Karanjali, Nischintapur Market and Nischintapur are stations on the Sealdah South section.

== Education ==
In 2013-14, Kulpi CD block had 208 primary schools with 18,284 students, 5 middle schools with 676 students, 15 high schools with 5,684 students and 17 higher secondary schools with 12,855 students. Kulpi CD block had 1 general degree college with 282 students, 1 technical/ professional institution with 100 students and 398 institutions for special and non-formal education with 17,695 students.

As per the 2011 census, in Kulpi CD block, amongst the 172 inhabited villages, 23 villages did not have a school, 57 villages had two or more primary schools, 35 villages had at least 1 primary and 1 middle school and 23 villages had at least 1 middle and 1 secondary school.

Dhola Mahavidyalaya was established at Dhola in 2009.

== Healthcare ==
In 2014, Kulpi CD block had 1 block primary health centre, 4 primary health centres and 4 private nursing homes with total 68 beds and 15 doctors (excluding private bodies). It had 33 family welfare subcentres. 4,219 patients were treated indoor and 172,533 patients were treated outdoor in the hospitals, health centres and subcentres of the CD block.

As per 2011 census, in Kulpi CD block, 1 village had a community health centre, 5 villages had primary health centres, 29 villages had primary health subcentres, 4 villages had maternity and child welfare centres, 2 villages had veterinary hospitals, 20 villages had medicine shops and out of the 172 inhabited villages 99 villages had no medical facilities.

Kulpi Block Primary Health Centre, Kulpi CD block, Kulpi, with 15 beds, is the major government medical facility in Kulpi CD block. There are primary health centres at Dakshin Jagadishpur (with 6 beds), Belpukur (with 10 beds), Ramkishorepur (with 6 beds) and Jamtalhat (with 6 beds).
