= Purba Ranaghat =

- Census Town
- Location in West Bengal Location in India
- Coordinates: 22.1403°N 88.4443°E
- Country: India
- State: West Bengal
- District: South 24 Parganas
- CD block: Mathurapur I

Area
  - Total: 1.85 km^{2} (0.71 sq mi)
- Elevation: 7 m (23 ft)

Population (2011)
  - Total: 5,207
  - Density: 2,810/km^{2} (7,290/sq mi)

Languages
  - Official: Bengali
  - Additional official: English
- Time zone: UTC+5:30 (IST)
- PIN: 743338
- Telephone code: +91 3174
- Vehicle registration: WB-19 to WB-22, WB-95 to WB-99
- Lok Sabha constituency: Mathurapur (SC)
- Vidhan Sabha constituency: Raidighi
- Website: www.s24pgs.gov.in

Purba Ranaghat is a census town within the jurisdiction of the Mathurapur police station in the Mathurapur I CD block in the Diamond Harbour subdivision of the South 24 Parganas district in the Indian state of West Bengal.

== Geography ==
Cities and towns in the eastern part of Diamond Harbour subdivision (including Magrahat I & II, Mandirbazar, Mathurapur I & II CD blocks) in South 24 Parganas district
M: municipal city/ town, CT: census town, R: rural/ urban centre, N: neighbourhood, T: religious centre
Owing to space constraints in the small map, the actual locations in a larger map may vary slightly

=== Area overview ===
Diamond Harbour subdivision is a rural subdivision with patches of urbanization. Only 14.61% of the population lives in the urban areas and an overwhelming 85.39% lives in the rural areas. In the eastern portion of the subdivision (shown in the map alongside) there are 24 census towns. The entire district is situated in the Ganges Delta and the eastern part of the district is a flat plain area with small towns, many in clusters. Location of places in the larger map varies a little. It is an OpenStreetMap, while we are using coordinates as in Google Maps.

Note: The map alongside presents some of the notable locations in the subdivision. All places marked in the map are linked in the larger full screen map.

=== Location ===
Purba Ranaghat is located at 22.1403°N 88.4443°E.

== Demographics ==
According to the 2011 Census of India, Purba Ranaghat had a total population of 5,207 of which 2,705 (52%) were males and 2,502 (48%) were females. There were 724 persons in the age range of 0–6 years. The total number of literate persons in Purba Ranaghat was 3,166 (70.62% of the population over 6 years).

== Infrastructure ==
According to the District Census Handbook 2011, Purba Ranaghat covered an area of 1.8488 km^{2}. Among the physical aspects, there is a railway station at Mathurapur Road 5 km away. Among the civic amenities, the protected water supply involved uncovered wells, tap water from untreated sources. It had 410 domestic electric connections. Among the medical facilities it had 2 hospitals. Among the educational facilities it had were 1 primary school, 1 secondary school, the nearest senior secondary school at Mathurapur, South 24 Parganas 12 km away. An important commodity it produced was rice.

== Transport ==
Bishnupur-Raidighi Road links Purba Ranaghat to the State Highway 1.

Mathurapur Road railway station is located nearby.

== Education ==
Ranaghata High School is a Bengali-medium coeducational institution established in 1965. It has facilities for teaching from class V to class X. It is housed in a rented building. It has a library with 1,000 books and 10 computers.

== Healthcare ==
Mathurapur Rural Hospital at Mathurapur, with 60 beds, is the major government medical facility in the Mathurapur I CD block.
