= Nischintapur =

Nischintapur is a common village name in Bangladesh, West Bengal and elsewhere in India, it may refer to:

- Nischintapur, Budge Budge, a census town in South 24 Parganas district of West Bengal, India
- Nischintapur, Howrah, a village in Howrah district of West Bengal, India
- Nischintapur, Kulpi, a village in South 24 Parganas district of West Bengal, India
