= Gobardhanpur =

- Village
- Location in West Bengal Location in India
- Coordinates: 21.6481°N 88.4045°E
- Country: India
- State: West Bengal
- District: South 24 Parganas
- CD Block: Patharpratima

Area
  - Total: 6.43 km^{2} (2.48 sq mi)
- Elevation: 4 m (13 ft)

Population (2011)
  - Total: 1,185
  - Density: 184/km^{2} (477/sq mi)

Languages
  - Official: Bengali
  - Additional official: English
- Time zone: UTC+5:30 (IST)
- PIN: 743371
- Telephone code: +91 3210
- Vehicle registration: WB-19 to WB-22, WB-95 to WB-99
- Lok Sabha constituency: Mathurapur (SC)
- Vidhan Sabha constituency: Patharpratima
- Website: www.s24pgs.gov.in

Gobardhanpur is a village within the jurisdiction of the Patharpratima police station in the Patharpratima CD block in the Kakdwip subdivision of the South 24 Parganas district in the Indian state of West Bengal.

== History ==
"The archaeological findings by villagers at Gobardhanpur and subsequent investigations by archaeologists have indicated a thriving settlement as old as the third century BC."

Semi-precious stone beads of early historic period have been found at Gobardhanpur.

A fisherman, Biswajit Sahu, has collected and preserved over the years artefacts during fishing trips to the Dhanchi and Bijwara forests in the tiger reserves area of the Sundarbans. A team of archaeologists visited Gobardhanpur to study the huge collection of artefacts that indicate the existence of an ancient civilisation belonging to the Mauryan era (322-185 BC).

== Geography ==
Places in Kakdwip subdivision (Kakdwip, Sagar, Namkhana, Patharpratima CD blocks) in South 24 Parganas district
R: rural/ urban centre
Places linked with coastal activity are marked in blue
Owing to space constraints in the small map, the actual locations in a larger map may vary slightly

=== Area overview ===
Kakdwip subdivision has full rural population. The entire district is situated in the Ganges Delta. The southern part of the delta has numerous channels and islands such as Henry Island, Sagar Island, Frederick Island and Fraserganj Island. The subdivision is a part of the Sundarbans settlements. A comparatively recent country-wide development is the guarding of the coastal areas by special coastal forces. The area attracts large number of tourists – Gangasagar and Fraserganj-Bakkhali are worth mentioning. Gobardhanpur holds a promise for the future.

Note: The map alongside presents some of the notable locations in the subdivision. All places marked in the map are linked in the larger full screen map.

=== Location ===
Gobardhanpur is located at 21.6481°N 88.4045°E.

== Demographics ==
As per the 2011 Census of India, Gobardhanpur had a total population of 1,185, of which 622 (52%) were males and 563 (48%) were females. Population below 6 years was 150. The total number of literates in Gobardhanpur was 916 (88.50% of the population over 6 years).

== Civic administration ==
=== Police station ===
Gobardhanpur coastal police station covers an area of 207 km^{2}. It has jurisdiction over parts of Patharpratima CD block.

== Tourism ==
There is a 5 km long beach at Gobardhanpur. As of 2019, the last road heads are Patharpratima or Ramganga, both around 18 km away. Then there is a ferry service for rest of the journey. The state government has plans to build a bridge at Patharpratima and build a road to around Gobardhanpur. The beach is claimed to be superior to all the existing sea-resorts in West Bengal. Optimists rate it on par with Goa beaches. One can also make the trip utilising motor-powered van rickshaws travelling along dirt tracks (it is the only available land transport in the area).

== Healthcare ==
Madhabnagar Rural Hospital at Madababnagar, with 30 beds, is the major government medical facility in the Patharpratima CD block.
