= Dhola, Kulpi =

Dhola
- Census Town
- Location in West Bengal Location in India
- Coordinates: 22.0385°N 88.2979°E
- Country: India
- State: West Bengal
- District: South 24 Parganas
- CD block: Kulpi

Area
  - Total: 1.65 km^{2} (0.64 sq mi)
- Elevation: 6 m (20 ft)

Population (2011)
  - Total: 5,804
  - Density: 3,520/km^{2} (9,110/sq mi)

Languages
  - Official: Bengali
  - Additional official: English
- Time zone: UTC+5:30 (IST)
- PIN: 743399
- Telephone code: +91 3174
- Vehicle registration: WB-19 to WB-22, WB-95 to WB-99
- Lok Sabha constituency: Mathurapur (SC)
- Vidhan Sabha constituency: Kulpi
- Website: www.s24pgs.gov.in

Dhola is a census town and a gram panchayat within the jurisdiction of the Kulpi police station in the Kulpi CD block in the Diamond Harbour subdivision of the South 24 Parganas district in the Indian state of West Bengal.

== Geography ==
Cities and towns in the western part of Diamond Harbour subdivision (including Falta, Diamond Harbour I & II, Kulpi CD blocks) in South 24 Parganas district
M: municipal city/ town, CT: census town, R: rural/ urban centre, N: neighbourhood, H: historical place/ religious centre
Owing to space constraints in the small map, the actual locations in a larger map may vary slightly

=== Area overview ===
Diamond Harbour subdivision is a rural subdivision with patches of urbanization. Only 14.61% of the population lives in the urban areas and an overwhelming 85.39% lives in the rural areas. In the western portion of the subdivision (shown in the map alongside) there are 11 census towns. The entire district is situated in the Ganges Delta and the western part, located on the east bank of the Hooghly River, is covered by the Kulpi Diamond Harbour Plain, which is 5–6 metres above sea level. Archaeological excavations at Deulpota and Harinarayanpur, on the bank of the Hooghly River indicate the existence of human habitation more than 2,000 years ago.

Note: The map alongside presents some of the notable locations in the subdivision. All places marked in the map are linked in the larger full screen map.

=== Location ===
Dhola is located at 22.0385°N 88.2979°E.

== Demographics ==
According to the 2011 Census of India, Dhola had a total population of 5,804, of which 2,952 (51%) were males and 2,852 (49%) were females. There were 1,010 persons in the age range of 0–6 years. The total number of literate persons in Dhola was 3,577 (74.61% of the population over 6 years).

== Civic administration ==
=== Police station ===
Dholahat police station covers an area of 312.67 km^{2}. It has jurisdiction over parts of the Kulpi, Mathurapur I, Kakdwip and Patharpratima CD blocks.

== Infrastructure ==
According to the District Census Handbook 2011, Dhola covered an area of 1.652 km^{2}. Among the civic amenities, the protected water supply involved over head tank. It had 418 domestic electric connections. Among the educational facilities it had were 2 primary schools, 2 middle schools, 2 secondary schools, 1 senior secondary school and 1 general degree college. Three important commodities it produced were zari work, pottery, sholapith products.

== Transport ==
A short stretch of local roads link Dhola to the National Highway 12.

Karanjali railway station is located nearby.

== Education ==
Dhola Mahavidyalaya, established in 2009, is affiliated with the University of Calcutta. It offers honours courses in Bengali, English, history and geography, and a general course in arts.

Dhola High School is a Bengali-medium, coeducational higher secondary school, established in 1936. It has arrangements for teaching from class IV to class XII.

== Healthcare ==
Kulpi Block Primary Health Centre at Kulpi, with 15 beds, is the major government medical facility in the Kulpi CD block.
