= Ramganga, Patharpratima =

Ramganga
- Village
- Location in West Bengal Location in India
- Coordinates: 21.8041°N 88.3715°E
- Country: India
- State: West Bengal
- District: South 24 Parganas
- CD Block: Patharpratima

Area
  - Total: 5.16 km^{2} (1.99 sq mi)
- Elevation: 4 m (13 ft)

Population (2011)
  - Total: 4,118
  - Density: 798/km^{2} (2,070/sq mi)

Languages
  - Official: Bengali
  - Additional official: English
- Time zone: UTC+5:30 (IST)
- PIN: 743371
- Telephone code: +91 3210
- Vehicle registration: WB-19 to WB-22, WB-95 to WB-99
- Lok Sabha constituency: Mathurapur (SC)
- Vidhan Sabha constituency: Patharpratima
- Website: www.s24pgs.gov.in

Ramganga is a village and a gram panchayat within the jurisdiction of the Patharpratima police station in the Patharpratima CD block in the Kakdwip subdivision of the South 24 Parganas district in the Indian state of West Bengal.

== Geography ==
Places in Kakdwip subdivision (Kakdwip, Sagar, Namkhana, Patharpratima CD blocks) in South 24 Parganas district
R: rural/ urban centre
Places linked with coastal activity are marked in blue
Owing to space constraints in the small map, the actual locations in a larger map may vary slightly

=== Area overview ===
Kakdwip subdivision has full rural population. The entire district is situated in the Ganges Delta. The southern part of the delta has numerous channels and islands such as Henry Island, Sagar Island, Frederick Island and Fraserganj Island. The subdivision is a part of the Sundarbans settlements. A comparatively recent country-wide development is the guarding of the coastal areas by special coastal forces. The area attracts large number of tourists – Gangasagar and Fraserganj-Bakkhali are worth mentioning. Gobardhanpur holds a promise for the future.

Note: The map alongside presents some of the notable locations in the subdivision. All places marked in the map are linked in the larger full screen map.

=== Location ===
Ramganga is located at 21.8041°N 88.3715°E.

== Demographics ==
As per the 2011 Census of India, Ramganga had a total population of 4,118, of which 2,129 (52%) were males and 1,989 (48%) were females. Population below 6 years was 439. The total number of literates in Ramganga was 3,096 (84.15% of the population over 6 years).

== Civic administration ==
=== CD block HQ ===
The headquarters of Patharpratima CD block are located at Ramganga.

== Transport ==
Ramganga Main Road links it to Kashinagar, near Raidighi.

Ramganga is the last stop on the road on the mainland. Thereafter, ferry services are available. There is an 18 km ferry service from Ramganga to Gobardhanpur/Sitarampur. There is 3.5 km long beach bordering the delta island. It is claimed to be superior to all the existing sea-resorts in West Bengal. There also are other ferry services from Ramganga/ Patharpratima, just across a creek.

== Healthcare ==
Madhabnagar Rural Hospital at Madababnagar, with 30 beds, is the major government medical facility in the Patharpratima CD block.
