= Krishna Chandrapur =

- Census Town
- Location in West Bengal Location in India
- Coordinates: 22.1233°N 88.4276°E
- Country: India
- State: West Bengal
- District: South 24 Parganas
- CD block: Mathurapur I

Area
  - Total: 3.00 km^{2} (1.16 sq mi)
- Elevation: 7 m (23 ft)

Population (2011)
  - Total: 8,146
  - Density: 2,720/km^{2} (7,030/sq mi)

Languages
  - Official: Bengali
  - Additional official: English
- Time zone: UTC+5:30 (IST)
- PIN: 743354
- Telephone code: +91 3174
- Vehicle registration: WB-19 to WB-22, WB-95 to WB-99
- Lok Sabha constituency: Mathurapur (SC)
- Vidhan Sabha constituency: Raidighi
- Website: www.s24pgs.gov.in

Krishna Chandrapur is a census town and a gram panchayat within the jurisdiction of the Mathurapur police station in the Mathurapur I CD block in the Diamond Harbour subdivision of the South 24 Parganas district in the Indian state of West Bengal.

== Geography ==
Cities and towns in the eastern part of Diamond Harbour subdivision (including Magrahat I & II, Mandirbazar, Mathurapur I & II CD blocks) in South 24 Parganas district
M: municipal city/ town, CT: census town, R: rural/ urban centre, N: neighbourhood, T: religious centre
Owing to space constraints in the small map, the actual locations in a larger map may vary slightly

=== Area overview ===
Diamond Harbour subdivision is a rural subdivision with patches of urbanization. Only 14.61% of the population lives in the urban areas and an overwhelming 85.39% lives in the rural areas. In the eastern portion of the subdivision (shown in the map alongside) there are 24 census towns. The entire district is situated in the Ganges Delta and the eastern part of the district is a flat plain area with small towns, many in clusters. Location of places in the larger map varies a little. It is an OpenStreetMap, while we are using coordinates as in Google Maps.

Note: The map alongside presents some of the notable locations in the subdivision. All places marked in the map are linked in the larger full screen map.

=== Location ===
Krishna Chandrapur is located at 22.1233°N 88.4276°E

== Demographics ==
According to the 2011 Census of India, Krishna Chandrapur had a total population of 8,146 of which 4,629 (52%) were males and 3,877 (48%) were females. There were 1,084 persons in the age range of 0–6 years. The total number of literate persons in Krishna Chndrapur was 5,359 (75.89% of the population over 6 years).

== Infrastructure ==
According to the District Census Handbook 2011, Krishna Chandrapur covered an area of 2.9961 km^{2}. Among the physical aspects, there is a railway station at Mathurapur Road 6 km away. Among the civic amenities, the protected water supply involved hand pumps. It had 674 domestic electric connections. Among the educational facilities it had were 1 primary school, 1 middle school, 1 secondary school, 1 senior secondary school, the nearest general degree college at Raidighi 15 km away. An important commodity it produced was paddy.

== Social scenario ==
According to the District Human Development Report for the South 24 Parganas, "The district is typically at the lower rung of the ladder in terms of district per capita income compared to other districts of West Bengal… This place also houses the largest proportion of backward people compared to the state… So far as the crime scenario is concerned the economically weaker group, i.e. the women and children, suffer the most in this district."

== Transport ==
Bishnupur-Raidighi Road links Krishna Chandrapur to the State Highway 1.

Mathurapur Road railway station is located nearby.

== Education ==
Krishna Chandrapur High School is a coeducational institution. It was recognised in 1948 and upgraded in 2009. It has facilities for teaching from class V to class XII. As of 2019, the school has a fiery headmaster, Chandan Kumar Maiti, who goes well beyond his duties to help his students, living in an economically and socially backward region, particularly in opposing early marriage of girls.

== Culture ==
The temple of goddess Tripura Sundari at Chhatrabhog is located nearby.

== Healthcare ==
Mathurapur Rural Hospital at Mathurapur, with 60 beds, is the major government medical facility in the Mathurapur I CD block.
