= Chhatrabhog =

- Village
- Location in West Bengal Location in India
- Coordinates: 22.1223°N 88.4247°E
- Country: India
- State: West Bengal
- District: South 24 Parganas
- CD Block: Mathurapur I

Area
  - Total: 0.46 km^{2} (0.18 sq mi)
- Elevation: 7 m (23 ft)

Population (2011)
  - Total: 684
  - Density: 1,500/km^{2} (3,900/sq mi)

Languages
  - Official: Bengali
  - Additional official: English
- Time zone: UTC+5:30 (IST)
- PIN: 743354
- Telephone code: +91 3174
- Vehicle registration: WB-19 to WB-22, WB-95 to WB-99
- Lok Sabha constituency: Mathurapur (SC)
- Vidhan Sabha constituency: Raidighi
- Website: www.s24pgs.gov.in

Chhatrabhog is a village within the jurisdiction of the Mathurapur police station in the Mathurapur I CD block in the Diamond Harbour subdivision of the South 24 Parganas district in the Indian state of West Bengal.

== History ==
Many janapadas grew up along the old Bhagirathi channel from the ancient times till around the 16th century: Kalighat, Boral, Rajpur, Harinavi, Mahinagar, Baruipur, Baharu, Jaynagar Majilpur, Chhatrabhog etc. Bipradas Pipilai's Manasavijaya, composed in 1495, mentions many places in this region. “Chand Sadagar, a merchant character of the Manasavijaya, reached Baruipur, from Kalighat, through the old Bhagirathi channel. From there he proceeded towards Chhatrabhog, and then traveling through Hatiagarh pargana reached the open sea.” Chaitanyadeva (1486-1534) also went through this route. Travelling by boat to Puri he halted at the village of Atisara, near Baruipur. "His last stoppage in 24 Parganas was at Chhatrabhog, now a village within the jurisdiction of the Mathurapur police station. Chhatrabhog seems to have been an important river-port on the old Bhagirathi channel." Rama Chandra Khan, the zamindar of Chhatrabhog, helped Chaitanyadeva to continue with his journey.

Chhatrabhog was a pilgrimage site in honor of the goddess Tripura Sundari set up first by King 'Kalinda' with the help of grandfather 'Patadarn' who belongs to ancient Tripura King dynasty of old Tribeg Kingdom and Ambulinga (Lord Shiva) from very earlier period. This place is regarded by local people as a Hindu Shakti 'Peeth Sthan'. Chakratirtha, an important part of greater Chatrabhog, is mentioned in a Sanskrit drama from the 11th century in Probodha Chandradoya, a commodeia of Krishna Misri. It is claimed that Chakratirtha is referred to as a janapada (the location of a flourishing settlement). According to local people and also authentic Book, Shri Chaitanyadev(1510 A. D.), Shri Shri Anukulchandra(1917 A.D.), Alibardi Khan (About 1744-1745 A.D.Grand father of Sirajuddaulla), Peer Gorachand(Near about 1350 A.D.) visited this place.

From the description of Chaitanya Bhagavata of Virndabon Das, hundred of mouths of Ganga/ Jhanabi were present at the time Chaitanya Mahaprabhu visited in 1510 A.D., where he bathed with his companion in Ambulinga Ghat. This was attached to God Ambulinga (Shiv). From the mythological source of Chaitanya Bhagavata, it is known that Chhatrabhog is the union place of Lord Shiva and Goddess Ganga. A mythological story is depicted in Antya Leela of Chaitanya Bhagavata.

== Geography ==
Chhatrabhog is located at 22°07′20″N 88°25′29″E. It has an average elevation of 7 metres (23 ft).

Although several small villages are named Chhatrabhog, originally it was a rather large region. From Jalghata village to Kumarpara (near Raidighi B. Ed. College) a triangular island had the same name. The northern and western sides of the Chhutorbhog river used to flow and meet with the Moni River. The Adi Ganga flows mainly into the Bhagirathi, in which the mythological King Bhagirath led to River Ganga to Sagar Confluence. Scholars suggest that five thousand years ago the Bay of Bengal was close to Chhatrabhog like Tmralipta port situated in Midnapore. One of Dashanami Sampradaya Giri who came from Uttar Pradesh to preach Saivaism in Bengal wrote Tarakeswar Shiv Tatwa. This book was published in the 18th century, sometime after 1729 A.D. In this book, Barashi Math Ambulinga Shiv temple was shown in Gangasagar.

== Demographics ==
According to the 2011 Census of India, Chhatrabhog had a total population of 684, of which 354 (52%) were males and 330 (48%) were females. There were 85 persons in the age range of 0–6 years. The total number of literate persons in Chhatrabhog was 437 (72.95% of the population over 6 years).

== Transport ==
Bishnupur-Raidighi Road links Chhatrabhog to the State Highway 1.

Mathurapur Road railway station is located nearby.

== Healthcare ==
Mathurapur Rural Hospital at Mathurapur, with 60 beds, is the major government medical facility in the Mathurapur I CD block.

== Gallery ==
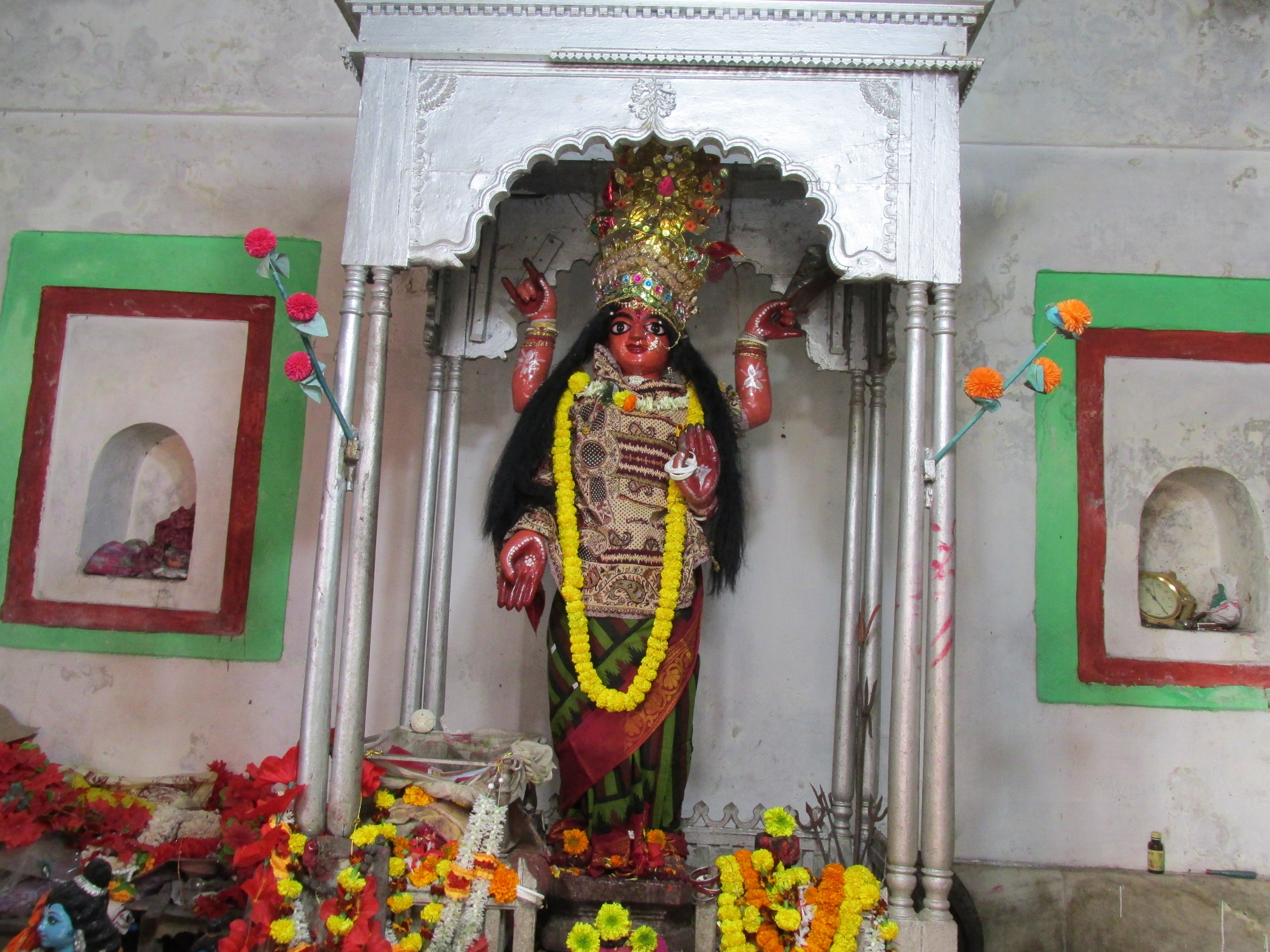
Maa TripuraSundari of Chhatrabhog The Goddess referred in Kavikankan's Chandi(1595 A.D.), worshiped by Dhanapati Sadagar.

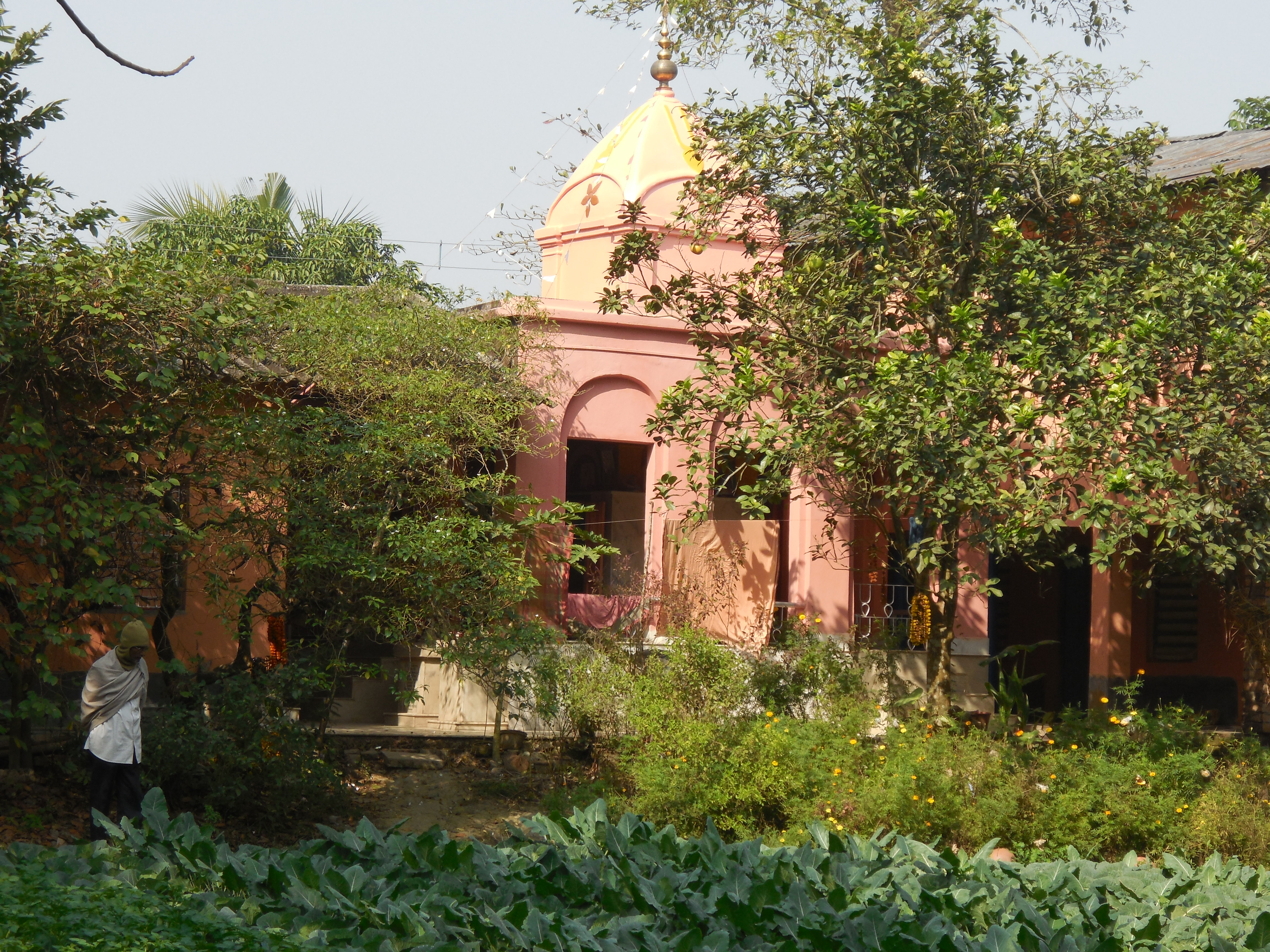
Gour Pada Peeth Temple commemorates the visit of Sri Chaitanyadeb to Chhatrabhog.( Foot print set up inside in 1929).

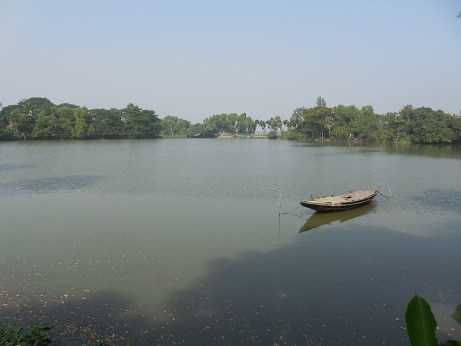
Raghab Dutta's Dighi (Used as an Old Source of Drinking water of Chhatrabhog

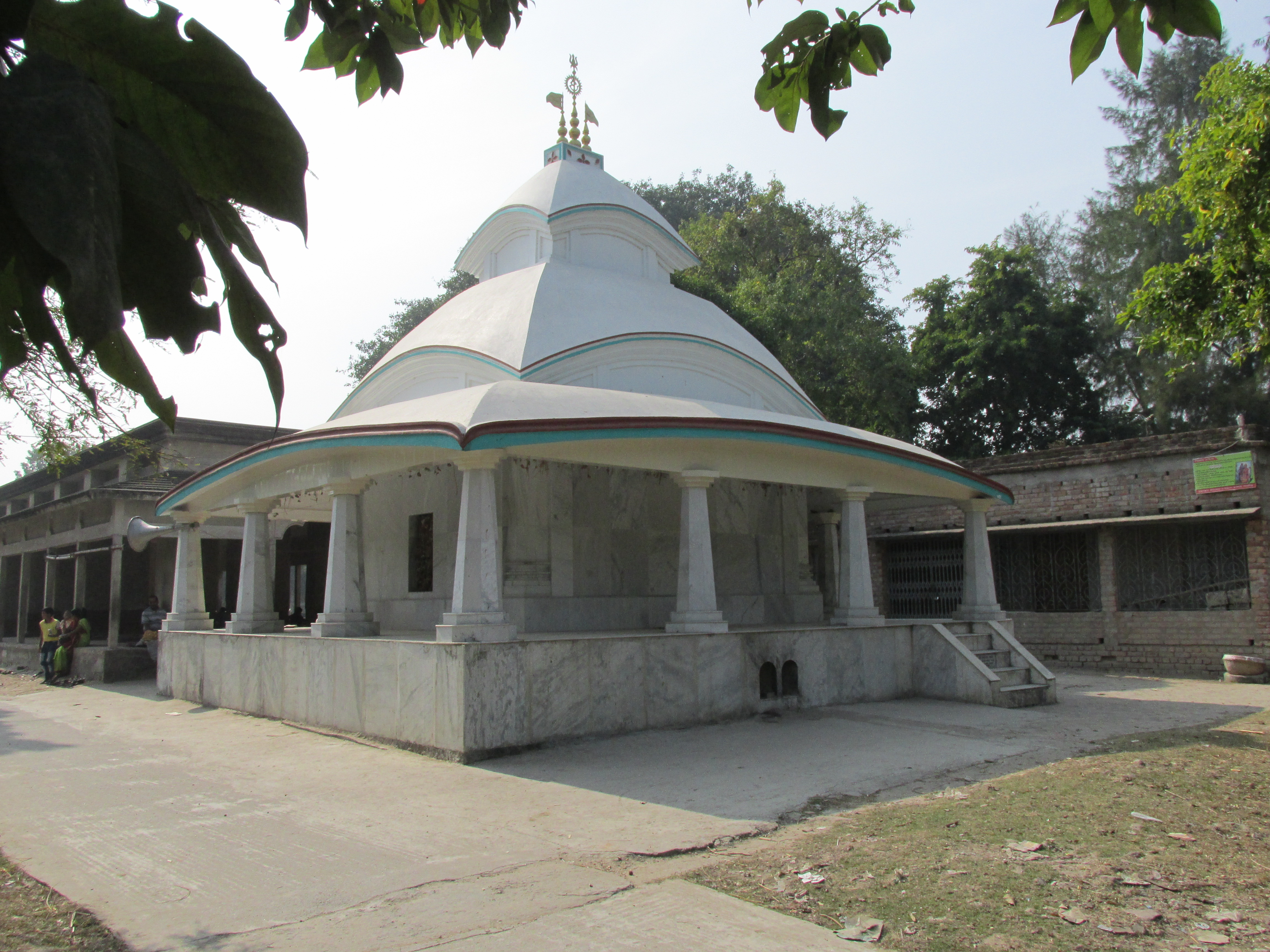
Ambu-Linga Shiva Temple (Barasi's Shiv). Shri Chaitanya Dev visited nearby Ghat at this place in 1510 A.D.The Nwabab of Bengal Alibardi Khan donated 550 Bigha Land for this Temple .
