= Samir Kumar Jana =

Indian politician

Member of the West Bengal Legislative Assembly
- Incumbent
- Assumed office 13 May 2011
- Preceded by: Jajneswar Das
- Constituency: Patharpratima

Personal details
- Party: AITC (until 2026); Democratic Trinamool Congress (from 2026)
- Profession: Politician

Samir Kumar Jana (born 1950) is an Indian politician from West Bengal. He is a three time member of the West Bengal Legislative Assembly from Patharpratima Assembly constituency in South 24 Parganas district. He won the 2021 West Bengal Legislative Assembly election representing the Democratic Trinamool Congress party.

== Early life and education ==
Jana is from Patharpratima, South 24 Parganas district, West Bengal. He is the son of late Rathikanta Jana. He completed his MA in 1986 at University of Calcutta. Earlier, he also did BA at a college affiliated with University of Calcutta. He is a retired teacher.

== Career ==
Jana won from Patharpratima Assembly constituency representing the All India Trinamool Congress in the 2021 West Bengal Legislative Assembly election. He polled 120,181 votes and defeated his nearest rival, Asit Kumar Haldar of the Bharatiya Janata Party, by a margin of 22,134 votes. He first became an MLA winning the 2011 West Bengal Legislative Assembly election defeating Jajneswar Das of Communist Party of India (Marxist) by a margin of 14,773 votes with a vote share of 8.11 per cent. He retained the seat for Trinamool Congress in 2016 Assembly election polling 107,595 votes, for a vote share 50.85 percent and won by a margin of 13793 votes. He won for the third time in 2021.

Earlier, he lost twice to Jajneswar Das of Communist Party of India (Marxist) in 2001 and 2006 election before defeating him in 2011.
