= Ambulinga Ghat =

Ambulinga Ghat is a bathing place depicted in the religious text Chaitanya Bhagavata, written by Vrindavana Dasa Thakura in the mid-16th century. It is considered one of the holy places of Jaiva Dharma. Ambulinga Ghat is located in the Indian state of West Bengal. "Ambu" means "water" in the Bengali language, and "linga" depicts the Hindu deity Shiva.

In the 16th century, the delta-shaped island was found in Chhatrabhog, where the Ganges river flowed in many separate streams. By the 18th century, its tributaries had dried up. The bathing place, or "ghat," is now found in Barashi village, located in South 24 Parganas district in Mathurapur I, Diamond Harbour subdivision.

Religious pilgrims consider Ambulinga Ghat a place where Lord Shiva and Mother Ganges are unified. The spiritual leader, Chaitanya Mahaprabhu, visited and bathed there in A.D. 1510.
