= Nischintapur, Kulpi =

Nischintapur
- Village
- Location in West Bengal Location in India
- Coordinates: 21.9902°N 88.2152°E
- Country: India
- State: West Bengal
- District: South 24 Parganas
- CD Block: Kulpi
- Elevation: 6 m (20 ft)

Languages
  - Official: Bengali
  - Additional official: English
- Time zone: UTC+5:30 (IST)
- PIN: 743374
- Telephone code: +91 3174
- Vehicle registration: WB-19 to WB-22, WB-95 to WB-99
- Lok Sabha constituency: Mathurapur (SC)
- Vidhan Sabha constituency: Kulpi
- Website: www.s24pgs.gov.in

Nischintapur is a village within the jurisdiction of the Kulpi police station in the Kulpi CD block in the Diamond Harbour subdivision of the South 24 Parganas district in the Indian state of West Bengal.

== Geography ==
Nischintapur is located at 21°59′25″N 88°12′55″E. It has an average elevation of 6 metres (20 ft).

== Transport ==
Nischintapur is on the National Highway 12.

Nischintapur and Nischintapur Market railway stations are on the Sealdah–Namkhana line of the Kolkata Suburban Railway system.

=== Commuters ===
With the electrification of the railways, suburban traffic has grown tremendously since the 1960s. As of 2005-06, more than 1.7 million (17 lakhs) commuters use the Kolkata Suburban Railway system daily. After the partition of India, refugees from erstwhile East Pakistan and Bangladesh had a strong impact on the development of urban areas in the periphery of Kolkata. The new immigrants depended on Kolkata for their livelihood, thus increasing the number of commuters. Eastern Railway runs 1,272 EMU trains daily.

== Healthcare ==
Kulpi Block Primary Health Centre, with 15 beds, at Kulpi, is the major government medical facility in the Kulpi CD block.
