= UKLR =

UKLR may refer to:

- UKLR, the ICAO code for Rivne International Airport, Ukraine
- UKLR, the Indian Railways station code for Ukilerhat railway station, West Bengal, India
