= Mathurapur I =

Community Development Block in West Bengal, India

- Community Development Block
- Location of Mathurapur I community development block in South 24 Parganas district
- Coordinates: 22.1203°N 88.3943°E
- Country: India
- State: West Bengal
- Division: Presidency
- District: South 24 Parganas
- Subdivision: Diamond Harbour
- Headquarters: Mathurapur

Government
  - Gram Panchayats: Abad Bhagawanpur, Dakshin Lakshminarayanpur, Debipur, Krishnachandrapur, Lalpur, Mathurapur Paschim, Mathurapur Purba, Nalua, Shankarpur, Uttar Lakshminarayanpur
  - Lok Sabha constituencies: Mathurapur
  - Vidhan Sabha constituencies: Raidighi, Mandirbazar

Area
  - Total: 147.30 km^{2} (56.87 sq mi)

Population (2011)
  - Total: 195,104
  - Density: 1,324.5/km^{2} (3,430.5/sq mi)
  - Urban: 25,841

Demographics
  - Literacy: 73.93 per cent
  - Sex ratio: 949 ♂/♀

Languages
  - Official: Bengali
  - Additional official: English
- Time zone: UTC+05:30 (IST)
- Website: s24pgs.gov.in

Mathurapur I is a community development block that forms an administrative division in Diamond Harbour subdivision of South 24 Parganas district in the Indian state of West Bengal.

== Geography ==

Mathurapur I CD block is located at 22°07′13″N 88°23′39″E. It has an average elevation of 7 metres (23 ft).

Mathurapur I CD block is bounded by Jaynagar II CD block in the north, Jaynagar II and Mathurapur II CD blocks in the east, Patharpratima CD block in the south, Kulpi and Mandirbazar CD locks in the west.

South 24 Parganas district is divided into two distinct physiographic zones: the marine-riverine delta in the north and the marine delta zone in the south. As the sea receded southwards, in the sub-recent geological period, a large low-lying plain got exposed. Both tidal inflows and the rivers have been depositing sediments in this plain. The periodical collapse of both the natural levees and man-made embankments speed up the process of filling up of the depressions containing brackish water wetlands. The marine delta in the south is formed of interlacing tidal channels. As non-saline water for irrigation is scarce, agriculture is monsoon dominated. Some parts of the wetlands are still preserved for raising fish.

Mathurapur I CD block has an area of 147.3 km^{2}. It has 1 panchayat samity, 10 gram panchayats, 112 gram sansads (village councils), 99 mouzas and 95 inhabited villages, as per the District Statistical Handbook, South Twenty-four Parganas. Mathurapur and Dholahat police stations serve this CD Block. Headquarters of this CD block is at Mathurapur.

Mathurapur I CD block has 15 km of embankments. Embankments raised along rivers are of critical importance for the safety of lives and protection of crops, against daily tides and tidal surges.

Gram panchayats of Mathurapur I CD block/panchayat samiti are: Abad Bhagawanpur, Dakshin Lakshminarayanpur, Debipur, Krishnachandrapur, Lalpur, Mathurapur Paschim, Mathurapur Purba, Nalua, Shankarpur and Uttar Lakshminarayanpur.

== Demographics ==
=== Population ===
As per the 2011 Census of India, Mathurapur I CD block had a total population of 195,104, of which 169,263 were rural and 25,841 were urban. There were 100,093 (51%) males and 95,001 (49%) females. Population below 6 years was 27,851. Scheduled Castes numbered 68,636 (35.18%) and Scheduled Tribes numbered 496 (0.25%).

As per the 2001 Census of India, Mathurapur I CD block had a total population of 164,585, out of which 84,933 were males and 79,652 were females. Mathurapur I CD block registered a population growth of 16.00 per cent during the 1991-2001 decade. Decadal growth for South 24 Parganas district was 20.89 per cent. Decadal growth in West Bengal was 17.84 per cent. Scheduled Castes at 63,968 formed more than one-third the population. Scheduled Tribes numbered 2,744.

Census Towns in Mathurapur I CD block (2011 census figures in brackets): Krishna Chandrapur (CT) (8,146), Mathurapur (CT) (7,797), Purba Ranaghat (CT) (5,207) and Lalpur (CT) (4,691).

Large villages (with 4,000+ population) in Mathurapur I CD block (2011 census figures in brackets): Uttarshibganj (4,155), Nalua (19,071), Srikrishnanagar (4,117), Uttar Lakshminarayanpur (10,006), Ghoradal (12,170), Krishna Rampur (6,204) and Ghatbakultala (4,435).

Other villages in Mathurapur I CD block include (2011 census figures in brackets): Debipur (2,920), Abad Bhagabanpur (1,736) and Chhatrabhog (684).

=== Literacy ===
As per the 2011 census, the total number of literates in Mathurapur I CD block was 123,647 (73.93% of the population over 6 years) out of which males numbered 79,311 (80.60% of the male population over 6 years) and females numbered 54,336 (66.87% of the female population over 6 years). The gender disparity (the difference between female and male literacy rates) was 13.74%.

As per the 2011 Census of India, literacy in South 24 Parganas district was 77.51 Literacy in West Bengal was 77.08% in 2011. Literacy in India in 2011 was 74.04%.

As per the 2001 Census of India, Mathurapur I CD block had a total literacy of 65.41 per cent for the 6+ age group. While male literacy was 77.38 per cent female literacy was 52.53 per cent. South 24 Parganas district had a total literacy of 69.45 per cent, male literacy being 79.19 per cent and female literacy being 59.01 per cent.

See also – List of West Bengal districts ranked by literacy rate

Literacy in CD blocks of
South 24 Parganas district
Alipore Sadar subdivision
Bishnupur I – 78.33%
Bishnupur II – 81.37%
Budge Budge I – 80.57%
Budge Budge II – 79.13%
Thakurpukur Maheshtala – 83.54%
Baruipur subdivision
Baruipur – 76.46%
Bhangar I – 72.06%
Bhangar II – 74.49%
Jaynagar I – 73.17%
Jaynagar II – 69.71%
Kultali – 69.37%
Sonarpur – 79.70%
Canning subdivision
Basanti – 68.32%
Canning I – 70.76%
Canning II – 66.51%
Gosaba – 78.98%
Diamond Harbour subdivision
Diamond Harbour I – 75.72%
Diamond Harbour II – 76.91%
Falta – 77.17%
Kulpi – 75.49%
Magrahat I – 73.82%
Magrahat II – 77.41%
Mandirbazar – 75.89%
Mathurapur I – 73.93%
Mathurapur II – 77.77%
Kakdwip subdivision
Kakdwip – 77.93%
Namkhana – 85.72
Patharpratima – 82.11%
Sagar – 84.21%
Source: 2011 Census: CD Block Wise
Primary Census Abstract Data

=== Language ===
Languages of Mathurapur I CD block (2011)
1. Bengali (99.9%)
2. Hindi (0.03%)
3. Urdu (0.02%)
4. Others (0.01%)

At the time of the 2011 census, 99.94% of the population spoke Bengali, 0.03% Hindi and 0.02% Urdu as their first language.

=== Religion ===
Religion in Mathurapur I CD block (2011)
| Hinduism | 59.44% |
| Islam | 40.41% |
| Other or not stated | 0.15% |

In the 2011 Census of India, Hindus numbered 115,977 and formed 59.44% of the population in Mathurapur I CD block. Muslims numbered 78,835 and formed 40.41% of the population. Others numbered 292 and formed 0.15% of the population. In 2001, Hindus and Muslims were 63.12% and 36.84% of the population respectively.

The proportion of Hindus in South Twenty-four Parganas district has declined from 76.0% in 1961 to 63.2% in 2011. The proportion of Muslims in South Twenty-four Parganas district has increased from 23.4% to 35.6% during the same period. Christians formed 0.8% in 2011.

== Rural poverty ==
As per the Human Development Report for South 24 Parganas district, published in 2009, in Mathurapur I CD block the percentage of households below poverty line was 34.43%. The poverty rates were very high in the Sundarbans settlements with all thirteen CD blocks registering poverty ratios above 30% and eight CD blocks had more than 40% of the population in the BPL category. The Sundarban region remains the most backward region in terms of quality of life. As per rural household survey in 2005, the proportion of households in South 24 Parganas with poverty rates below poverty line was 34.11%, way above the state and national poverty ratios.

== Economy ==
=== Livelihood ===
Livelihood
in Mathurapur I CD block
1. Cultivators (10.2%)
2. Agricultural labourers (36.9%)
3. Household industries (7.80%)
4. Other Workers (45.1%)

In Mathurapur I CD block in 2011, among the class of total workers, cultivators numbered 6,565 and formed 10.22%, agricultural labourers numbered 23,667 and formed 36.85%, household industry workers numbered 5,010 and formed 7.80% and other workers numbered 28,977 and formed 45.12%. Total workers numbered 64,219 and formed 32.92% of the total population, and non-workers numbered 130,885 and formed 67.08% of the population.

The District Human Development Reportpoints out that in the blocks of region situated in the close proximity of the Kolkata metropolis, overwhelming majority are involved in the non-agricultural sector for their livelihood. On the other hand, in the Sundarban region, overwhelming majority are dependent on agriculture. In the intermediate region, there is again predominance of the non-agricultural sector. Though the region is not very close to Kolkata, many places are well connected and some industrial/ economic development has taken place.

Note: In the census records a person is considered a cultivator, if the person is engaged in cultivation/ supervision of land owned by self/government/institution. When a person who works on another person's land for wages in cash or kind or share, is regarded as an agricultural labourer. Household industry is defined as an industry conducted by one or more members of the family within the household or village, and one that does not qualify for registration as a factory under the Factories Act. Other workers are persons engaged in some economic activity other than cultivators, agricultural labourers and household workers. It includes factory, mining, plantation, transport and office workers, those engaged in business and commerce, teachers, entertainment artistes and so on.

=== Infrastructure ===
There are 91 inhabited villages in Mathurapur I CD block, as per the District Census Handbook, South Twenty-four Parganas, 2011. 100% villages have power supply. 89 villages (97.80%) have drinking water supply. 30 villages (32.97%) have post offices. 82 villages (90.11%) have telephones (including landlines, public call offices and mobile phones). 34 villages (37.36%) have pucca (paved) approach roads and 14 villages (15.38%) have transport communication (includes bus service, rail facility and navigable waterways). 2 villages (2.20%) have agricultural credit societies and 5 villages (5.49%) have banks.

=== Agriculture ===
South 24 Parganas had played a significant role in the Tebhaga movement launched by the Communist Party of India in 1946. Subsequently, "Operation Barga" was aimed at securing tenancy rights for the peasants. In Mathurapur I CD block 979.88 acres of land was acquired and vested. Out of this 607.37 acres or 62.02% of the vested land was distributed. The total number of patta (document) holders was 1,787.

According to the District Human Development Report, agriculture is an important source of livelihood in South Twentyfour Parganas district. The amount of cultivable land per agricultural worker is only 0.41 hectare in the district. Moreover, the irrigation facilities have not been extended to a satisfactory scale. Agriculture mostly remains a mono-cropped activity.

As per the District Census Handbook, the saline soil of the district is unfit for cultivation, but the non-salty lands are very fertile. While rice is the main food crop, jute is the main cash crop.

In 2013–14, there were 78 fertiliser depots, 15 seed stores and 57 fair price shops in Mathurapur I CD block.

In 2013–14, Mathurapur I CD block produced 1,374 tonnes of Aman paddy, the main winter crop, from 1,068 hectares, 10,669 tonnes of Boro paddy (spring crop) from 3,864 hectares, 74 tonnes of wheat from 25 hectares, 1,122 tonnes of potatoes from 33 hectares. It also produced pulses and oilseeds.

=== Irrigation ===
In Mathurapur I CD block, in 2013–14, 32.99 hectares were irrigated by deep tube well.

Poor irrigation and high soil salinity results in the mono-cropping pattern of cultivation in a major portion of the South 24 Parganas district. As a result of its closeness to the Bay of Bengal, the river waters are mostly saline and are unsuitable for irrigation. Added to the rather gloomy irrigation scenario is the problem of frequent floods.

=== Pisciculture ===
In Mathurapur I CD block, in 2013–14, net area under effective pisciculture was 877 hectares, engaging 2,169 persons in the profession, and with an approximate annual production of 51,511 quintals.

Pisciculture is an important source of employment in South 24 Parganas district. As of 2001, more than 4.5 lakh people were engaged in Pisciculture. Out of this 2.57 lakhs were from the 13 blocks in the Sundarbans settlements.

=== Banking ===
In 2013–14, Mathurapur I CD block had offices of 7 commercial banks.

=== Backward Regions Grant Fund ===
South 24 Parganas district is listed as a backward region and receives financial support from the Backward Regions Grant Fund. The fund, created by the Government of India, is designed to redress regional imbalances in development. As of 2012, 272 districts across the country were listed under this scheme. The list includes 11 districts of West Bengal.

== Transport ==
Mathurapur I CD block has 1 originating/ terminating bus route. 4 bus routes have ceased to operate.

Mathurapur Road is a station on the Sealdah South section.

== Education ==
In 2013–14, Mathurapur I had 125 primary schools with 11,687 students, 9 middle schools with 824 students, 8 high schools with 2,012 students and 17 higher secondary schools with 10,244 students. Mathurapur I CD block had 393 institutions for special and non-formal education with 16,360 students.

See also – Education in India

As per the 2011 census, in Mathurapur I CD block, among the 91 inhabited villages, 9 villages did not have a school, 33 villages had two or more primary schools, 27 villages had at least 1 primary and 1 middle school and 16 villages had at least 1 middle and 1 secondary school.

== Healthcare ==
In 2014, Mathurapur I CD block had 1 rural hospital, 2 primary health centres and 2 NGO/ private nursing homes with total 82 beds and 11 doctors (excluding private bodies). It had 37 family welfare subcentres. 4,502 patients were treated indoor and 119,814 patients were treated outdoor in the hospitals, health centres and subcentres of the CD block.

As per 2011 census, in Mathurapur I CD block, 3 villages had primary health centres, 26 villages had primary health subcentres, 1 village had a maternity and child welfare centre, 5 villages had medicine shops and out of the 51 inhabited villages 17 villages had no medical facilities.

Mathurapur Rural Hospital at Mathurapur, with 60 beds, is the major government medical facility in Mathurapur I CD block. There are primary health centres at Jadavpur (with 6 beds) and Ghatbakultala (with 10 beds).
