= Patharpratima (community development block) =

Community Development Block in West Bengal, India

- Community Development Block
- Location of Patharpratima community development block in South 24 Parganas district
- Coordinates: 21.7941°N 88.3555°E
- Country: India
- State: West Bengal
- Division: Presidency
- District: South 24 Parganas
- Subdivision: Kakdwip
- Headquarters: Ramganga

Government
  - Gram Panchayats: Achintyanagar, Banashyamnagar, Brajaballavpur, Dakshin Gangadharpur, Dakshin Raipur, Digambarpur, Durbachati, G Plot, Gopalnagar, Herambagopalpur, Laksmijanardanpur, Patharpratima, Ramganga, Sridharnagar, Srinarayanpur Purnachandrapur
  - Lok Sabha constituencies: Mathurapur
  - Vidhan Sabha constituencies: Patharpratima

Area
  - Total: 484.47 km^{2} (187.05 sq mi)

Population (2011)
  - Total: 331,823
  - Density: 684.92/km^{2} (1,773.9/sq mi)

Demographics
  - Literacy: 82.11 per cent
  - Sex ratio: 959 ♂/♀

Languages
  - Official: Bengali
  - Additional official: English
- Time zone: UTC+05:30 (IST)
- Website: s24pgs.gov.in

Patharpratima is a community development block that forms an administrative division in Kakdwip subdivision of South 24 Parganas district in the Indian state of West Bengal.

== Geography ==

Patharpratima CD block is located at 21°47′39″N 88°21′20″E. It has an average elevation of 4 metres (13 ft).

Patharpratima CD block is bounded by Mathurapur I and Mathurapur II CD blocks in the north, Sundarbans forests in the east, Bay of Bengal in the south, Namkhana, Kakdwip and Kulpi CD blocks in the west.

South 24 Parganas district is divided into two distinct physiographic zones: the marine-riverine delta in the north and the marine delta zone in the south. As the sea receded southwards, in the sub-recent geological period, a large low-lying plain got exposed. Both tidal inflows and the rivers have been depositing sediments in this plain. The periodical collapse of both the natural levees and man-made embankments speed up the process of filling up of the depressions containing brackish water wetlands. The marine delta in the south is formed of interlacing tidal channels. As non-saline water for irrigation is scarce, agriculture is monsoon dominated. Some parts of the wetlands are still preserved for raising fish.

Patharpratima CD block has an area of 484.47 km^{2}. It has 1 panchayat samity, 15 gram panchayats, 187 gram sansads (village councils), 92 mouzas and 87 inhabited villages, as per the District Statistical Handbook, South Twenty-four Parganas. Patharpratima, Dholahat and Gobardhanpur Coastal police stations serve this CD Block. Headquarters of this CD block is at Ramganga.

Patharpratima CD block has 241.9 km of embankments, the 2nd highest among the thirteen Sundarban CD blocks. Breaches in these embankments varied from 5.9 km in 2002-03 to 18.8 km in 2005-06. Embankments raised along rivers are of critical importance for the safety of lives and protection of crops, against daily tides and tidal surges. Technologically the embankment structures are weak and there is need of proper drainage of accumulated rain water through sluice gates. Crude cuts in embankments for drainage of accumulated rain water and channels built for providing water to large fisheries (bheris) also add to the hazards. Cyclones and tropical depressions are regular threats.

Gram panchayats of Patharpratima CD block/panchayat samiti are: Achintyanagar, Banashyamnagar, Brajaballavpur, Dakshin Gangadharpur, Dakshin Raipur, Digambarpur, Durbachati, G Plot, Gopalnagar, Herambagopalpur, Laksmijanardanpur, Patharpratima, Ramganga, Sridharnagar and Srinarayanpur Purnachandrapur.

== Demographics ==
=== Population ===
As per the 2011 Census of India, Patharpratima CD block had a total population of 331,823, all of which were rural. There were 169,422 (51%) males and 162,401 (49%) females. Population below 6 years was 42,021. Scheduled Castes numbered 76,163 (22.95%) and Scheduled Tribes numbered 2,640 (0.80%).

As per the 2001 Census of India, Patharpratima CD block had a total population of 288,259, out of which 147,518 were males and 140,741 were females. Patharprtima CD block registered a population growth of 17.37 per cent during the 1991-2001 decade. Decadal growth for South 24 Parganas district was 20.89 per cent. Decadal growth in West Bengal was 17.84 per cent. Scheduled Castes at 72,402 formed around one-fourth the population. Scheduled Tribes numbered 3,670.

Large villages (with 4,000+ population) in Patharpratima CD block (2011 census figures in brackets): Dakshin Gangadharpur (13,738), Bhajna (5,307), Srinarayanpur (5,098), Taranagar (4,425), Purna Chandrapur (4,099), Dakshin Durgapur (5,722), Dakshin Raypur (9,858), Indra Narayanpur (4,120), Digambarpur (6,577), Ramganga (4,118), Paschim Surendra Nagar (6,378), Gopalnagar Dakshin (5,059), Gopalnagar Uttar (4,492), Durgagobindopur (4,326), Madhab Nagar (5,615), Paschim Dwarkapur (4,097), Baradapur (4,356), Kishorinagar (4,177), Dakshin Lakshminarayanpur (4,379), Dakshin Shibganj (5,828), Chhoto Banashyam Nagar (5,124), Sibnagar (5,666), Banashyam Nagar (5,347), Achintya Nagar (6,181), Lakshmi Janardanpur (4,567), Kuemuri (5,096), Purba Surendranagar (5,130), Heramba Gopalpur (6,672), Dakshin Kashinagar (5,454), Purba Sripatinagar (4,077), Paschim Sripatinagar (6,342), Upendra Nagar (4,915), Rakhalpur (6,076), Sridhar Nagar (7,625), Rakshaskhali (4,729), Kshetra Mohanpur (5,589), Brojoballabpur (6,671), Gobindapur Abad (6,226), Dakshin Surendraganj (4,350), Indrapur (5,335) and Sitarampur (4,388).

Other villages in Patharpratima CD block include (2011 census figures in brackets): Durbachati (3,830).

=== Literacy ===
As per the 2011 census, the total number of literates in Patharpratima CD block was 237,955 (82.11% of the population over 6 years) out of which males numbered 131,063 (88.54% of the male population over 6 years) and females numbered 106,892 (75.40% of the female population over 6 years). The gender disparity (the difference between female and male literacy rates) was 13.14%.

As per the 2011 Census of India, literacy in South 24 Parganas district was 77.51 Literacy in West Bengal was 77.08% in 2011. Literacy in India in 2011 was 74.04%.

As per the 2001 Census of India, Patharpratima CD block had a total literacy of 72.77 per cent for the 6+ age group. While male literacy was 84.30 per cent female literacy was 60.64 per cent. South 24 Parganas district had a total literacy of 69.45 per cent, male literacy being 79.19 per cent and female literacy being 59.01 per cent.

See also – List of West Bengal districts ranked by literacy rate

Literacy in CD blocks of
South 24 Parganas district
Alipore Sadar subdivision
Bishnupur I – 78.33%
Bishnupur II – 81.37%
Budge Budge I – 80.57%
Budge Budge II – 79.13%
Thakurpukur Maheshtala – 83.54%
Baruipur subdivision
Baruipur – 76.46%
Bhangar I – 72.06%
Bhangar II – 74.49%
Jaynagar I – 73.17%
Jaynagar II – 69.71%
Kultali – 69.37%
Sonarpur – 79.70%
Canning subdivision
Basanti – 68.32%
Canning I – 70.76%
Canning II – 66.51%
Gosaba – 78.98%
Diamond Harbour subdivision
Diamond Harbour I – 75.72%
Diamond Harbour II – 76.91%
Falta – 77.17%
Kulpi – 75.49%
Magrahat I – 73.82%
Magrahat II – 77.41%
Mandirbazar – 75.89%
Mathurapur I – 73.93%
Mathurapur II – 77.77%
Kakdwip subdivision
Kakdwip – 77.93%
Namkhana – 85.72
Patharpratima – 82.11%
Sagar – 84.21%
Source: 2011 Census: CD Block Wise
Primary Census Abstract Data

=== Language ===
Languages of Patharpratima CD block (2011)
1. Bengali (99.8%)
2. Hindi (0.21%)
3. Urdu (0.02%)
4. Others (0.01%)

At the time of the 2011 census, 99.76% of the population spoke Bengali, 0.21% Hindi and 0.02% Urdu as their first language.

=== Religion ===
Religion in Patharpratima CD block (2011)
Hinduism	88.91%
Islam	10.72%
Other or not stated	0.37%

In the 2011 Census of India, Hindus numbered 295,027 and formed 88.91% of the population in Patharpratima CD block. Muslims numbered 35,566 and formed 10.72% of the population. Others numbered 1,230 and formed 0.37% of the population. In 2001, Hindus and Muslims made up 90.43% and 9.31% of the population respectively.

The proportion of Hindus in South Twenty-four Parganas district has declined from 76.0% in 1961 to 63.2% in 2011. The proportion of Muslims in South Twenty-four Parganas district has increased from 23.4% to 35.6% during the same period. Christians formed 0.8% in 2011.

== Rural poverty ==
As per the Human Development Report for South 24 Parganas district, published in 2009, in Patharpratima CD block the percentage of households below poverty line was 49.13%. The poverty rates were very high in the Sundarbans settlements with all thirteen CD blocks registering poverty ratios above 30% and eight CD blocks had more than 40% of the population in the BPL category. The Sundarban region remains the most backward region in terms of quality of life. As per rural household survey in 2005, the proportion of households in South 24 Parganas with poverty rates below poverty line was 34.11%, way above the state and national poverty ratios.

== Economy ==
=== Livelihood ===
Livelihood
in Patharpratima CD block
1. Cultivators (24.1%)
2. Agricultural labourers (49.1%)
3. Household industries (3.12%)
4. Other Workers (23.7%)

In Patharpratima CD block in 2011, amongst the class of total workers, cultivators numbered 33,944 and formed 24.07%, agricultural labourers numbered 69,222 and formed 49.09%, household industry workers numbered 4,396 and formed 3.12% and other workers numbered 33,439 and formed 23.72%. Total workers numbered 141,001 and formed 42.49% of the total population, and non-workers numbered 190,822 and formed 57.51% of the population.

The District Human Development Report points out that in the blocks of region situated in the close proximity of the Kolkata metropolis, overwhelming majority are involved in the non-agricultural sector for their livelihood. On the other hand, in the Sundarban region, overwhelming majority are dependent on agriculture. In the intermediate region, there is again predominance of the non-agricultural sector. Though the region is not very close to Kolkata, many places are well connected and some industrial/ economic development has taken place.

Note: In the census records a person is considered a cultivator, if the person is engaged in cultivation/ supervision of land owned by self/government/institution. When a person who works on another person's land for wages in cash or kind or share, is regarded as an agricultural labourer. Household industry is defined as an industry conducted by one or more members of the family within the household or village, and one that does not qualify for registration as a factory under the Factories Act. Other workers are persons engaged in some economic activity other than cultivators, agricultural labourers and household workers. It includes factory, mining, plantation, transport and office workers, those engaged in business and commerce, teachers, entertainment artistes and so on.

=== Infrastructure ===
There are 87 inhabited villages in Patharpratima CD block, as per the District Census Handbook, South Twenty-four Parganas, 2011. 100% villages have power supply. 86 villages (98.85%) have drinking water supply. 46 villages (52.57%) have post offices. 82 villages (94.25%) have telephones (including landlines, public call offices and mobile phones). 13 villages (14.94%) have pucca (paved) approach roads and 26 villages (29.89%) have transport communication (includes bus service, rail facility and navigable waterways). 7 villages (8.05%) have agricultural credit societies and 11 villages (12.64%) have banks.

=== Agriculture ===
South 24 Parganas had played a significant role in the Tebhaga movement launched by the Communist Party of India in 1946. Subsequently, Operation Barga was aimed at securing tenancy rights for the peasants. In Patharpratima CD block, 14,660.14 acres of land was acquired and vested. Out of this 8,604.22 acres or 56.89% of the vested land was distributed among the peasants. The total number of patta (document) holders was 13,264.

According to the District Human Development Report, agriculture is an important source of livelihood in South Twentyfour Parganas district. The amount of cultivable land per agricultural worker is only 0.41 hectare in the district. Moreover, the irrigation facilities have not been extended to a satisfactory scale. Agriculture mostly remains a mono-cropped activity.

As per the District Census Handbook, the saline soil of the district is unfit for cultivation, but the non-salty lands are very fertile. While rice is the main food crop, jute is the main cash crop.

In 2013-14, there were 156 fertiliser depots, 15 seed stores and 7 fair price shops in Patharpratima CD block.

In 2013–14, Patharpratima CD block produced 77,077 tonnes of Aman paddy, the main winter crop, from 3,372 hectares, 3,772 tonnes of Boro paddy (spring crop) from 1,223 hectares, 4,214 tonnes of wheat and 1,276 tonnes of potatoes from 38 hectares. It also produced pulses and oilseeds.

=== Pisciculture ===
In Patharpratima CD block, in 2013-14, net area under effective pisciculture was 5,805 hectares, engaging 41,452 persons in the profession, and with an approximate annual production of 109,125 quintals.

Pisciculture is an important source of employment in South 24 Parganas district. As of 2001, more than 4.5 lakh people were engaged in Pisciculture. Out of this 2.57 lakhs were from the 13 blocks in the Sundarbans.

=== Banking ===
In 2013-14, Patharpratima CD block had offices of 6 commercial banks and 6 gramin banks.

=== Backward Regions Grant Fund ===
South 24 Parganas district is listed as a backward region and receives financial support from the Backward Regions Grant Fund. The fund, created by the Government of India, is designed to redress regional imbalances in development. As of 2012, 272 districts across the country were listed under this scheme. The list includes 11 districts of West Bengal.

== Transport ==
Patharpratima CD block has 43 ferry services and 2 originating/ terminating bus routes. The nearest railway station is 44 (forty-four) km from the block headquarters.

== Education ==
In 2013-14, Patharpratima had 218 primary schools with 17,360 students, 20 middle schools with 2,875 students, 14 high schools with 5,920 students and 25 higher secondary schools with 18,281 students. Patharpratima CD block had 1 general degree college with 979 students, 610 institutions for special and non-formal education with 25,568 students.

See also – Education in India

As per the 2011 census, in Patharpratima CD block, amongst the 87 inhabited villages, all villages had schools, 78 villages had two or more primary schools, 55 villages had at least 1 primary and 1 middle school and 39 villages had at least 1 middle and 1 secondary school.

Patharpratima Mahavidyalaya was established at Patharpratima in 2001.

== Healthcare ==
In 2014, Patharpratima CD block had 1 rural hospital, 3 primary health centres and 7 NGO/ private nursing homes with total 93 beds and 13 doctors (excluding private bodies). It had 65 family welfare subcentres. 3,815 patients were treated indoor and 66,575 patients were treated outdoor in the hospitals, health centres and subcentres of the CD block.

As per 2011 census, in Patharpratima CD block, 3 villages had primary health centres, 61 villages had primary health subcentres, 8 villages had maternity and child welfare centres, 3 villages had veterinary hospitals, 43 villages had medicine shops and out of the 87 inhabited villages 6 villages had no medical facilities.

Madhabnagar Rural Hospital at Madababnagar, with 30 beds, is the major government medical facility in Patharpratima CD block. There are primary health centres at Gadamathurpur (with 10 beds), Brajballavpur (with 15 beds) and Indrapur (with 10 beds).
