= Nischintapur, Howrah =

Nischintapur is a village in West Bengal, India. Administratively it is under Amta II (community development block) of Uluberia subdivision, Haora District, West Bengal.

== Demographics ==
In the 2001 census, the village of Nischintapur had 2,220 inhabitants, with 1,172 males (52.8%) and 1,048 females (47.2%), for a gender ratio of 894 females per thousand males.
