= Patharpratima =

- Village
- Location in West Bengal Location in India
- Coordinates: 21.7941°N 88.3555°E
- Country: India
- State: West Bengal
- District: South 24 Parganas
- CD Block: Patharpratima
- Elevation: 4 m (13 ft)

Languages
  - Official: Bengali
  - Additional official: English
- Time zone: UTC+5:30 (IST)
- PIN: 743371
- Telephone code: +91 3210
- Vehicle registration: WB-19 to WB-22, WB-95 to WB-99
- Lok Sabha constituency: Mathurapur (SC)
- Vidhan Sabha constituency: Patharpratima
- Website: www.s24pgs.gov.in

Patharpratima is a village and a gram panchayat within the jurisdiction of the Patharpratima police station in the Patharpratima CD block in the Kakdwip subdivision of the South 24 Parganas district in the Indian state of West Bengal.

== Geography ==
Places in Kakdwip subdivision (Kakdwip, Sagar, Namkhana, Patharpratima CD blocks) in South 24 Parganas district
R: rural/ urban centre
Places linked with coastal activity are marked in blue
Owing to space constraints in the small map, the actual locations in a larger map may vary slightly

=== Area overview ===
Kakdwip subdivision has full rural population. The entire district is situated in the Ganges Delta. The southern part of the delta has numerous channels and islands such as Henry Island, Sagar Island, Frederick Island and Fraserganj Island. The subdivision is a part of the Sundarbans settlements. A comparatively recent country-wide development is the guarding of the coastal areas by special coastal forces. The area attracts large number of tourists – Gangasagar and Fraserganj-Bakkhali are worth mentioning. Gobardhanpur holds a promise for the future.

Note: The map alongside presents some of the notable locations in the subdivision. All places marked in the map are linked in the larger full screen map.

=== Location ===
Patharpratima is located at 21.7941°N 88.3555°E.

Patharpratima is not identified as a separate place in 2011 census but it is marked in Google maps. The entire island is called Patharpratima. The map of CD block Patharpratima on page 889 in District Census Handbook for South 24 Parganas shows Pathapratima police station in Dakshin Shibganj mouza (village no. 375).

== Civic administration ==
=== Police station ===
Patharpratima police station covers an area of 293.96 km^{2}. It has jurisdiction over parts of Patharpratima CD block.

== Transport ==
Patharpratima is on the Kakdwip-Gangadharpur Road.

== Education ==
Patharpratima Mahavidyalaya, established in 2001, is affiliated with the University of Calcutta. It offers honours courses in Bengali, English, Sanskrit, history, political science, philosophy, geography, education and economics, and general courses in arts, science and commerce.

Patharpratima Anandalal Adarsha Vidyalaya is a Bengali-medium coeducational institution established in 1961. It has facilities for teaching from class V to class XII.

== Healthcare ==
Madhabnagar Rural Hospital at Madababnagar, with 30 beds, is the major government medical facility in the Patharpratima CD block.
