= Kulpi =

- Village
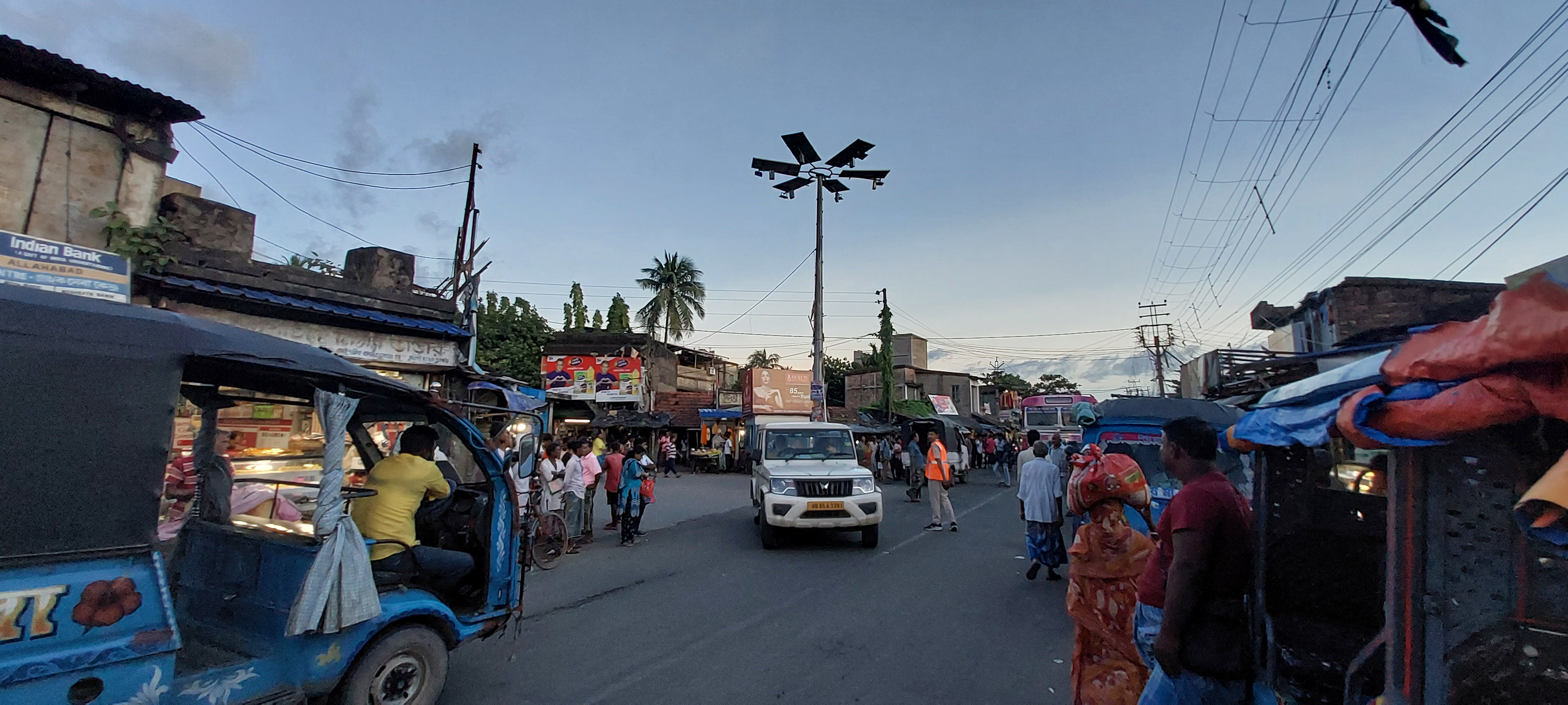
- Kulpi bus stand

- Location in West Bengal Location in India
- Coordinates: 22.0815°N 88.2449°E
- Country: India
- State: West Bengal
- District: South 24 Parganas
- CD block: Kulpi

Area
  - Total: 0.81 km^{2} (0.31 sq mi)
- Elevation: 6 m (20 ft)

Population (2011)
  - Total: 2,000
  - Density: 2,500/km^{2} (6,400/sq mi)

Languages
  - Official: Bengali
  - Additional official: English
- Time zone: UTC+5:30 (IST)
- PIN: 743351
- Telephone code: +91 3174
- Vehicle registration: WB-19 to WB-22, WB-95 to WB-99
- Lok Sabha constituency: Mathurapur (SC)
- Vidhan Sabha constituency: Kulpi
- Website: www.s24pgs.gov.in

Kulpi is a village and a gram panchayat within the jurisdiction under Kulpi police station in the Kulpi CD block in the Diamond Harbour subdivision of the South 24 Parganas district in the Indian state of West Bengal.

== History ==
In the 18th century this area was occupied by Portuguese pirates. So, the Nawab of Bengal stationed about 150 soldiers to make this area free.

== Geography ==
Cities and towns in the western part of Diamond Harbour subdivision (including Falta, Diamond Harbour I & II, Kulpi CD blocks) in South 24 Parganas district
M: municipal city/ town, CT: census town, R: rural/ urban centre, N: neighbourhood, H: historical place/ religious centre
Owing to space constraints in the small map, the actual locations in a larger map may vary slightly

=== Area overview ===
Diamond Harbour subdivision is a rural subdivision with patches of urbanization. Only 14.61% of the population lives in the urban areas and an overwhelming 85.39% lives in the rural areas. In the western portion of the subdivision (shown in the map alongside) there are 11 census towns. The entire district is situated in the Ganges Delta and the western part, located on the east bank of the Hooghly River, is covered by the Kulpi Diamond Harbour Plain, which is 5–6 metres above sea level. Archaeological excavations at Deulpota and Harinarayanpur, on the bank of the Hooghly River indicate the existence of human habitation more than 2,000 years ago.

Note: The map alongside presents some of the notable locations in the subdivision. All places marked in the map are linked in the larger full screen map.

=== Location ===
Kulpi is located at 22°04′53″N 88°14′42″E. It has an average elevation of 6 metres (20 ft).

== Demographics ==
According to the 2011 Census of India, Kulpi had a total population of 2,000, of which 982 (49%) were males and 1,018 (51%) were females. There were 192 persons in the age range of 0–6 years. The total number of literate persons was 1,478 (81.75% of the population over 6 years).

== Civic administration ==
=== Police station ===
Kulpi police station covers an area of 166.63 km^{2}. It has jurisdiction over parts of the Kulpi CD block.

=== CD block HQ ===
The headquarters of the Kulpi CD block are located at PO Paschim Gopalnagar, Kulpi.

== Economy ==
=== Industry ===
In January 2014, the Government of West Bengal gave its clearance for the development of a ship breaking yard.

== Transport ==
Kulpi is on the junction of the National Highway 12 and State Highway 1.

Kulpi railway station is on the Sealdah–Namkhana line of the Kolkata Suburban Railway system.

=== Commuters ===
With the electrification of the railways, suburban traffic has grown tremendously since the 1960s. As of 2005–06, more than 1.7 million (17 lakhs) commuters use the Kolkata Suburban Railway system daily. After the partition of India, refugees from erstwhile East Pakistan and Bangladesh had a strong impact on the development of urban areas in the periphery of Kolkata. The new immigrants depended on Kolkata for their livelihood, thus increasing the number of commuters. Eastern Railway runs 1,272 EMU trains daily.

== Education ==
Kulpi Janapriya High School is a coeducational higher secondary institution.

== Healthcare ==
Kulpi Block Primary Health Centre, with 15 beds, at Kulpi, is the major government medical facility in the Kulpi CD block.
