= Patharpratima Assembly constituency =

Constituency of the West Bengal Legislative Assembly, in India

Patharpratima
- Constituency No. 130 for the West Bengal Legislative Assembly
- Interactive Map Outlining Patharpratima Assembly Constituency

Constituency details
- Country: India
- Region: East India
- State: West Bengal
- District: South 24 Parganas
- Lok Sabha constituency: Mathurapur
- Established: 1967
- Total electors: 263,513
- Reservation: None

Member of Legislative Assembly
- 18th West Bengal Legislative Assembly
- Incumbent Samir Kumar Jana
- Party: DTC
- Elected year: 2011

Patharpratima Assembly constituency is a Legislative Assembly constituency of South 24 Parganas district in the Indian State of West Bengal.

== Overview ==
As per order of the Delimitation Commission in respect of the Delimitation of constituencies in the West Bengal, Patharpratima Assembly constituency is composed of the following:

- Patharpratima community development block

Patharpratima Assembly constituency is a part of No. 20 Mathurapur Lok Sabha constituency.

== Members of the Legislative Assembly ==
Year	Name	Party
1967	Rabin Mondal	Socialist Unity Centre of India (Communist)
1969	Rabin Mondal	Socialist Unity Centre of India (Communist)
1971	Rabin Mondal	Socialist Unity Centre of India (Communist)
1972	Satya Ranjan Bapuli	Indian National Congress
1977	Gunadhar Maity	Communist Party of India (Marxist)
1982	Gunadhar Maity	Communist Party of India (Marxist)
1987	Gunadhar Maity	Communist Party of India (Marxist)
1991	Janmenjay Manna	Communist Party of India (Marxist)
1996	Gopal Krishna Dey	Indian National Congress
2001	Jajneswar Das	Communist Party of India (Marxist)
2006	Jajneswar Das	Communist Party of India (Marxist)
2011	Samir Kumar Jana	Trinamool Congress
2016	Samir Kumar Jana	Trinamool Congress
2021	Samir Kumar Jana	Trinamool Congress
2026	Samir Kumar Jana	Trinamool Congress

== Election results ==
=== 2026 ===
2026 West Bengal Legislative Assembly election: Patharpratima
Party	Candidate	Votes	%	±%
AITC	Samir Kumar Jana	117,164	47.62	▼4.23
BJP	Asit Kumar Haldar	112,291	45.64	▲3.34
CPI(M)	Satya Ranjan Das	11,491	4.67	
NOTA	None of the above	1,044	0.42	▼0.1
Majority		4,873	1.98	▼7.57
Turnout		246,059	95.42	▲7.51
AITC hold		Swing		

=== 2021 ===
2021 West Bengal Legislative Assembly election: Patharpratima
Party	Candidate	Votes	%	±%
AITC	Samir Kumar Jana	120,181	51.85	▲1.0
BJP	Asit Kumar Haldar	98,047	42.3	▲39.02
INC	Shukdeb Jana	10,182	4.39	▼39.94
NOTA	None of the above	1,214	0.52	
Majority		22,134	9.55	
Turnout		231,786	87.91	
AITC hold		Swing		

=== 2016 ===
2016 West Bengal Legislative Assembly election: Patharpratima
Party	Candidate	Votes	%	±%
AITC	Samir Kumar Jana	107,595	50.85	▼1.54
INC	Phanibhushan Giri	93,802	44.33	New entry
BJP	Sridhar Chandra Bagari	6,942	3.28	▲1.33
SUCI(C)	Pabitra Maity	1,895	0.90	New entry
NOTA	None of the above	1,377	0.65	New entry
Majority		13,793	6.52	▼1.59
Turnout		2,11,611	89.35	▼1.96
AITC hold		Swing		

=== 2011 ===
2011 West Bengal Legislative Assembly election: Patharpratima
Party	Candidate	Votes	%	±%
AITC	Samir Kumar Jana	95,422	52.39	
CPI(M)	Jajneswar Das	80,649	44.28	
BJP	Mantu Ram Gayen	3,553	1.95	
Independent	Nikhil Chandra Bera	1,389	0.76	
Independent	Alauddin Molla	1,138	0.62	
Majority		14,773	8.11	
Turnout		1,82,151	91.31	
AITC gain from CPI(M)		Swing		

=== 2006 ===
In 2006 and 2001, Jajneswar Das of CPI(M) won the Patharpratima Assembly constituency defeating his nearest rival Samir Kumar Jana of AITC. Gopal Krishna Dey of INC won in 1996 defeating Janmenjay Manna of CPI(M). In 1991, Janmenjay Manna of CPI(M) defeated Banabehari Patra of INC. Gunadhar Maity of CPI(M) won in 1987, 1982 and 1977 defeating Ananta Kumar Bera of INC.

=== 1972 ===
Satya Ranjan Bapuli of INC won in 1972. Rabin Mondal of SUCI(C) won in 1971, 1969 and 1967. The seat did not exist prior to that.
