= Mathurapur, South 24 Parganas =

Mathurapur
- Census Town
- Location in West Bengal Location in India
- Coordinates: 22°6′57.922″N 88°23′36.928″E
- Country: India
- State: West Bengal
- District: South 24 Parganas
- CD Block: Mathurapur I

Area
  - Total: 5.02 km^{2} (1.94 sq mi)
- Elevation: 7 m (23 ft)

Population (2011)
  - Total: 7,797
  - Density: 1,550/km^{2} (4,020/sq mi)

Languages
  - Official: Bengali
  - Additional official: English
- Time zone: UTC+5:30 (IST)
- PIN: 743354
- Telephone code: +91 3174
- Vehicle registration: WB-19 to WB-22, WB-95 to WB-99
- Lok Sabha constituency: Mathurapur (SC)
- Vidhan Sabha constituency: Mandirbazar (SC)
- Website: www.s24pgs.gov.in

Mathurapur is a census town and a gram panchayat within the jurisdiction of the Mathurapur police station in the Mathurapur I CD block in the Diamond Harbour subdivision of the South 24 Parganas district in the Indian state of West Bengal.

== Geography ==
Cities and towns in the eastern part of Diamond Harbour subdivision (including Magrahat I & II, Mandirbazar, Mathurapur I & II CD blocks) in South 24 Parganas district
M: municipal city/ town, CT: census town, R: rural/ urban centre, N: neighbourhood, T: religious centre
Owing to space constraints in the small map, the actual locations in a larger map may vary slightly

=== Area overview ===
Diamond Harbour subdivision is a rural subdivision with patches of urbanization. Only 14.61% of the population lives in the urban areas and an overwhelming 85.39% lives in the rural areas. In the eastern portion of the subdivision (shown in the map alongside) there are 24 census towns. The entire district is situated in the Ganges Delta and the eastern part of the district is a flat plain area with small towns, many in clusters. Location of places in the larger map varies a little. It is an OpenStreetMap, while we are using coordinates as in Google Maps.

Note: The map alongside presents some of the notable locations in the subdivision. All places marked in the map are linked in the larger full screen map.

=== Location ===
Mathurapur is located at 22°07′13″N 88°23′39″E. It has an average elevation of 7 metres (23 ft).

== Demographics ==
According to the 2011 Census of India, Mathurapur had a total population of 7,797, of which 3,970 (51%) were males and 3,827 (49%) were females. There were 874 persons in the age range of 0–6 years. The total number of literate persons in Mathurapur was 5,722 (82.65% of the population over 6 years).

== Civic administration ==
=== Police station ===
Mathurapur police station is responsible for an area of 115 km^{2}. It has jurisdiction over parts of the Mathurapur I CD block.

=== CD block HQ ===
The headquarters of the Mathurapur I CD block are located at PO Mathurapur.

== Infrastructure ==
According to the District Census Handbook 2011, Mathurapur covered an area of 5.0169 km^{2}. Among the physical aspects, there is a railway station at Mathurapur Road 2 km away. Among the civic amenities, the protected water supply involved uncovered wells. It had 736 domestic electric connections. Among the medical facilities it had a family welfare centre in the town and a nursing home 0.5 km away. Among the educational facilities it had were 6 primary schools, 2 middle schools, 2 secondary schools, the nearest senior secondary school at Ramnagar 1 km away. An important commodity it produced was paddy.

== Social scenario ==
According to the District Human Development Report for the South 24 Parganas, “The district is typically at the lower rung of the ladder in terms of district per capita income compared to other districts of West Bengal... This place also houses the largest proportion of backward people compared to the state... So far as the crime scenario is concerned the economically weaker group, i.e. the women and children, suffer the most in this district.”

== Transport ==
Mathurapur is on the State Highway 1.

Mathurapur Road railway station is on the Sealdah–Namkhana line of the Kolkata Suburban Railway system.

=== Commuters ===
With the electrification of the railways, suburban traffic has grown tremendously since the 1960s. As of 2005–06, more than 1.7 million (17 lakhs) commuters use the Kolkata Suburban Railway system daily. After the partition of India, refugees from erstwhile East Pakistan and Bangladesh had a strong impact on the development of urban areas in the periphery of Kolkata. The new immigrants depended on Kolkata for their livelihood, thus increasing the number of commuters. Eastern Railway runs 1,272 EMU trains daily.

== Education ==
Mathurapur High School is a Bengali-medium coeducational institution established in 1923. It has facilities for teaching from class VI to class XII.

Bhetkipur High School is a Bengali-medium coeducational institution established in 1945. It has facilities for teaching from class VI to class XII.

== Healthcare ==
Mathurapur Rural Hospital at Mathurapur, with 60 beds, is the major government medical facility in the Mathurapur I CD block.
