= Baruipur (community development block) =

Community Development Block in West Bengal, India

- Community Development Block
- Location of Baruipur community development block in South 24 Parganas district
- Coordinates: 22.3654432°N 88.4325028°E
- Country: India
- State: West Bengal
- Division: Presidency
- District: South 24 Parganas
- Subdivision: Baruipur
- Headquarters: Piali

Government
  - Gram Panchayats: Begumpur, Belegachhia, Brindakhali, Champahati, Dhapdhapi-I, Dhapdhapi-II, Hardhah, Hariharpur, Kalyanpur, Madarat, Mallikpur, Nabagram, Ramnagar-I, Ramnagar-II, Shankarpur-I, Shankarpur-II, Shikharbali-I, Shikharbali-II, South Garia
  - Lok Sabha constituencies: Jadavpur
  - Vidhan Sabha constituencies: Baruipur Purba, Baruipur Paschim

Area
  - Total: 226.16 km^{2} (87.32 sq mi)

Population (2011)
  - Total: 433,119
  - Density: 1,915.1/km^{2} (4,960.1/sq mi)
  - Urban: 117,312

Demographics
  - Literacy: 76.46 per cent
  - Sex ratio: 958 ♂/♀

Languages
  - Official: Bengali
  - Additional official: English
- Time zone: UTC+05:30 (IST)
- Website: s24pgs.gov.in

Baruipur is a community development block that forms an administrative division in Baruipur subdivision of South 24 Parganas district in the Indian state of West Bengal.

== Geography ==

The Baruipur CD block is located at 22°21′56″N 88°25′57″E. It has an average elevation of 9 metres (30 ft).

The Baruipur CD block is bounded by the Sonarpur CD block in the north, the Canning I CD block in the east, the Jaynagar I CD block in the south, the Magrahat II and Bishnupur I CD blocks in the west.

The South 24 Parganas district is divided into two distinct physiographic zones: the marine-riverine delta in the north and the marine delta zone in the south. As the sea receded southwards, in the sub-recent geological period, a large low-lying plain got exposed. Both tidal inflows and the rivers have been depositing sediments in this plain. The periodical collapse of both the natural levees and man-made embankments speed up the process of filling up of the depressions containing brackish water wetlands. The marine delta in the south is formed of interlacing tidal channels. As non-saline water for irrigation is scarce, agriculture is monsoon dominated. Some parts of the wetlands are still preserved for raising fish.

The Baruipur CD block has an area of 226.16 km^{2} (87.32 sq mi). It has 1 panchayat samity, 19 gram panchayats, 307 gram sansads (village councils), 138 mouzas and 122 inhabited villages, as per the District Statistical Handbook, South Twenty-four Parganas. Baruipur police station serves this CD Block. Headquarters of this CD block is at Piyali Town.

Gram panchayats of Baruipur CD block/panchayat samiti are: Begumpur, Belegachhia, Brindakhali, Champahati, Dhapdhapi-I, Dhapdhapi-II, Hardhah, Hariharpur, Kalyanpur, Madarat, Mallikpur, Nabagram, Ramnagar-I, Ramnagar-II, Shankarpur-I, Shankarpur-II, Shikharbali-I, Shikharbali-II and South Garia.

== Demographics ==
=== Population ===
According to the 2011 Census of India, Baruipur CD block had a total population of 433,119, of which 315,817 were rural and 117,312 were urban. There were 221,200 (51%) males and 211,919 (49%) females. There were 50,049 persons in the age range of 0 to 6 years. The Scheduled Castes numbered 165,537 (38.22%) and the Scheduled Tribes numbered 1,145 (0.26%).

According to the 2001 Census of India, the Baruipur CD block had a total population of 351,569, out of which 181,486 were males and 170,083 were females. The Baruipur CD block registered a population growth of 28.12 per cent during the 1991-2001 decade. Decadal growth for the South 24 Parganas district was 20.89 per cent. Decadal growth in West Bengal was 17.84 per cent. Scheduled Castes at 158,882 formed around one-third the population. Scheduled Tribes numbered 7,176.

Census Towns in the Baruipur CD block (2011 census figures in brackets): Petua (9,596), Garia (4,805), Panchghara (6,340), Mallikpur (19,120), Hariharpur (12,027), Champahati (12,111), Solgohalia (9,373), Naridana (4,277), Baruipur (CT) (22,430), Salipur (P) (5,091), Khodar Bazar (6,360) and Komarhat (5,782).

Large villages (with 4,000+ population) in the Baruipur CD block (2011 census figures in brackets): Faridpur (4,512), Ganespur (4,530), Begampur (12,742), Indrapal (4,088), Sikhar Bali (6,205), Sasan (P) (7,123), Balbalia (4,759), Panch Gachhia (4,710), Teruhat (4,423), Ramnagar (17,053), Padmajala (4,937), Sitakundu (11,354), Uttar Bhag (6,748), Kuruli (5,755), Brinda Khali (10,762), Nabagram (8,452) and Betberia (5,125).

Other villages in the Baruipur CD block include (2011 census figures in brackets): Gocharan (1,147), Sankarpur (1,630).

=== Literacy ===
According to the 2011 census, the total number of literate persons in the Baruipur CD block was 292,095 (76.46% of the population over 6 years) out of which males numbered 160,710 (82.17% of the male population over 6 years) and females numbered 132,195 (70.52% of the female population over 6 years). The gender disparity (the difference between female and male literacy rates) was 11.65%.

In the 2011 Census of India, literacy in the South 24 Parganas district was 77.51 Literacy in West Bengal was 77.08% in 2011. Literacy in India in 2011 was 74.04%.

In the 2001 Census of India, the Baruipur CD block had a total literacy of 68.86 per cent for the 6+ age group. While male literacy was 77.88 per cent female literacy was 59.17 per cent. The South 24 Parganas district had a total literacy of 69.45 per cent, male literacy being 79.19 per cent and female literacy being 59.01 per cent.

See also – List of West Bengal districts ranked by literacy rate

Literacy in CD blocks of
South 24 Parganas district
Alipore Sadar subdivision
Bishnupur I – 78.33%
Bishnupur II – 81.37%
Budge Budge I – 80.57%
Budge Budge II – 79.13%
Thakurpukur Maheshtala – 83.54%
Baruipur subdivision
Baruipur – 76.46%
Bhangar I – 72.06%
Bhangar II – 74.49%
Jaynagar I – 73.17%
Jaynagar II – 69.71%
Kultali – 69.37%
Sonarpur – 79.70%
Canning subdivision
Basanti – 68.32%
Canning I – 70.76%
Canning II – 66.51%
Gosaba – 78.98%
Diamond Harbour subdivision
Diamond Harbour I – 75.72%
Diamond Harbour II – 76.91%
Falta – 77.17%
Kulpi – 75.49%
Magrahat I – 73.82%
Magrahat II – 77.41%
Mandirbazar – 75.89%
Mathurapur I – 73.93%
Mathurapur II – 77.77%
Kakdwip subdivision
Kakdwip – 77.93%
Namkhana – 85.72
Patharpratima – 82.11%
Sagar – 84.21%
Source: 2011 Census: CD Block Wise
Primary Census Abstract Data

=== Language ===
Languages of Baruipur CD block (2011)
1. Bengali (95.5%)
2. Hindi (3.50%)
3. Urdu (0.94%)
4. Others (0.01%)

At the time of the 2011 census, 95.55% of the population spoke Bengali, 3.50% Hindi and 0.94% Urdu as their first language.

=== Religion ===
Religion in Baruipur CD block (2011)
Hinduism	62.86%
Islam	34.96%
Christianity	0.89%
Other or not stated	1.29%

In the 2011 Census of India, Hindus numbered 273,627 and formed 62.86% of the population in the Baruipur CD block. Muslims numbered 160,073 and formed 34.96% of the population. Others numbered 9,439 and formed 2.18% of the population. Amongst the others, Christians numbered 3,852. In 2001, Hindus were 63.54% of the population, while Muslims and Christians were 35.43% and 0.77% of the population respectively.

The proportion of Hindus in the South Twenty-four Parganas district has declined from 76.0% in 1961 to 63.2% in 2011. The proportion of Muslims in the South Twenty-four Parganas district has increased from 23.4% to 35.6% during the same period. Christians formed 0.8% in 2011.

== Rural poverty ==
According to the Human Development Report for the South 24 Parganas district, published in 2009, in the Baruipur CD block the percentage of households below poverty line was 26.04%, a moderate level of poverty. In the north-east and mid central portion of the district, all CD blocks, with the exception of the Kulpi CD block, had poverty rates below 30%. As per the rural household survey in 2005, the proportion of households in South 24 Parganas with poverty rates below poverty line was 34.11%, way above the state and national poverty ratios. The poverty rates were very high in the Sundarbans settlements with all the thirteen CD blocks registering poverty ratios above 30% and eight CD blocks had more than 40% of the population in the BPL category.

== Economy ==
=== Livelihood ===
Livelihood
in Baruipur CD block
1. Cultivators (10.8%)
2. Agricultural labourers (22.0%)
3. Household industries (5.39%)
4. Other Workers (61.8%)

In the Baruipur CD block in 2011, among the class of total workers, cultivators numbered 16,671 and formed 10.78%, agricultural labourers numbered 34,014 and formed 22.00%, household industry workers numbered 8,327 and formed 5.39% and other workers numbered 95,584 and formed 61.83%. Total workers numbered 154,596 and formed 35.69% of the total population, and non-workers numbered 278,523 and formed 64.31% of the population.

The District Human Development Report points out that in the blocks of the region situated in the close proximity of the Kolkata metropolis, overwhelming majority are involved in the non-agricultural sector for their livelihood. On the other hand, in the Sundarbans settlements, overwhelming majority are dependent on agriculture. In the intermediate region, there is again predominance of the non-agricultural sector. Though the region is not very close to Kolkata, many places are well connected and some industrial/ economic development has taken place.

Note: In the census records a person is considered a cultivator, if the person is engaged in cultivation/ supervision of land owned by self/government/institution. When a person who works on another person's land for wages in cash or kind or share, is regarded as an agricultural labourer. Household industry is defined as an industry conducted by one or more members of the family within the household or village, and one that does not qualify for registration as a factory under the Factories Act. Other workers are persons engaged in some economic activity other than cultivators, agricultural labourers and household workers. It includes factory, mining, plantation, transport and office workers, those engaged in business and commerce, teachers, entertainment artistes and so on.

=== Infrastructure ===
There are 122 inhabited villages in the Baruipur CD block, as per the District Census Handbook, South Twenty-four Parganas, 2011. 100% villages have power supply. 122 villages (100%) have drinking water supply. 28 villages (22.95%) have post offices. 116 villages (95.08%) have telephones (including landlines, public call offices and mobile phones). 74 villages (60.66%) have pucca (paved) approach roads and 29 villages (23.77%) have transport communication (includes bus service, rail facility and navigable waterways). 7 villages (5.74%) have banks.

=== Agriculture ===
The South 24 Parganas had played a significant role in the Tebhaga movement launched by the Communist Party of India in 1946. Subsequently, Operation Barga was aimed at securing tenancy rights for the peasants. In the Baruipur CD block 1,512.20 acres of land was acquired and vested. Out of this 1,409.09 acres or 93.18% of the vested land was distributed. The total number of patta (document) holders was 3,309.

According to the District Human Development Report, agriculture is an important source of livelihood in the South Twentyfour Parganas district. The amount of cultivable land per agricultural worker is only 0.41 hectare in the district. Moreover, the irrigation facilities have not been extended to a satisfactory scale. Agriculture mostly remains a mono-cropped activity.

As per the District Census Handbook, the saline soil of the district is unfit for cultivation, but the non-salty lands are very fertile. While rice is the main food crop, jute is the main cash crop.

In 2013–14, there were 120 fertiliser depots, 15 seed stores and 68 fair price shops in the Baruipur CD block.

In 2013–14, the Baruipur CD block produced 3,599 tonnes of Aman paddy, the main winter crop from 2,110 hectares, 17,140 tonnes of Boro paddy (spring crop) from 5,575 hectares.

=== Irrigation ===
In the Baruipur CD block, in 2013–14, 25.3 hectares were irrigated by deep tube wells.

=== Pisciculture ===
In the Baruipur CD block, in 2013–14, the net area under effective pisciculture was 1,228 hectares, engaging 11,770 persons in the profession, and with an approximate annual production of 23,060 quintals.

Pisciculture is an important source of employment in the South 24 Parganas district. As of 2001, more than 4.5 lakh people were engaged in pisciculture. Out of this 2.57 lakhs were from the 13 blocks in the Sundarbans settlements.

=== Banking ===
In 2013–14, the Baruipur CD block had offices of 27 commercial banks and 3 gramin banks.

=== Backward Regions Grant Fund ===
The South 24 Parganas district is listed as a backward region and receives financial support from the Backward Regions Grant Fund. The fund, created by the Government of India, is designed to redress regional imbalances in development. As of 2012, 272 districts across the country were listed under this scheme. The list includes 11 districts of West Bengal.

== Transport ==
Baruipur CD block has 6 originating/ terminating bus routes.

Mallikpur, Baruipur Junction, Shasan Road, Krishna Mohan, Dhapdhapi, Surjyapur, Gocharan, Kalyanpur, Dakshin Durgapur and Champahati are stations on the Sealdah South section.

== Education ==
In 2013–14, the Baruipur CD block had 174 primary schools with 23,747 students, 7 middle schools with 638 students, 5 high schools with 1,811 students and 26 higher secondary schools with 23,152 students. Baruipur CD block had 3 general degree colleges with 10,027 students and 591 institutions for special and non-formal education with 26,221 students.

See also – Education in India

According to the 2011 census, in Baruipur CD block, among the 122 inhabited villages, 4 villages did not have a school, 44 villages had two or more primary schools, 38 villages had at least 1 primary and 1 middle school and 18 villages had at least 1 middle and 1 secondary school.

Sushil Kar College was established at Champahati in 1968.

Ashar Alo is a private school at Piyali where girl students from poor families are provided free education, which in addition to the standard formal education they are taught singing, dancing and drawing.

== Healthcare ==
Certain areas of the South 24 Parganas district have been identified where ground water is affected by Arsenic Contamination. High levels of arsenic in ground water were found in twelve CD blocks of the district. Water samples collected from tubewells in the affected places contained arsenic above the normal level (10 micrograms per litre as specified by the World Health Organization). The affected CD blocks are Baruipur, Bhangar I, Bhangar II, Bishnupur I, Bishnupur II, Basanti, Budge Budge II, Canning I, Canning II, Sonarpur, Magrahat II and Jaynagar I.

In 2014, the Baruipur CD block had 1 block primary health centre, 2 primary health centres and 14 private nursing homes with total 122 beds and 22 doctors (excluding private bodies). It had 48 family welfare subcentres. 725 patients were treated indoor and 92,675 patients were treated outdoor in the hospitals, health centres and subcentres of the CD block.

According to the 2011 census, in the Baruipur CD block, 3 villages had community health centres, 5 villages had primary health centres, 40 villages had primary health subcentres, 6 villages had maternity and child welfare centres, 3 villages had veterinary hospitals, 25 villages had medicine shops and out of the 122 inhabited villages 38 villages had no medical facilities.

Hariharpur Block Primary Health Centre at Hariharpur, PO Mallikpur, with 10 beds is the major government medical facility in the Baruipur CD block. There are primary health centres at Indrapala (PO Kudrali) (with 6 beds) and Panchgachhia (PO Gocharan) (with 6 beds).
