= Solgohalia =

- Census Town
- Location in West Bengal Location in India
- Coordinates: 22.3955°N 88.5154°E
- Country: India
- State: West Bengal
- District: South 24 Parganas
- CD block: Baruipur

Area
  - Total: 2.70 km^{2} (1.04 sq mi)
- Elevation: 9 m (30 ft)

Population (2011)
  - Total: 9,373
  - Density: 3,470/km^{2} (8,990/sq mi)

Languages
  - Official: Bengali
  - Additional official: English
- Time zone: UTC+5:30 (IST)
- PIN: 743330
- Telephone code: +91 33
- Vehicle registration: WB-19 to WB-22, WB-95 to WB-99
- Lok Sabha constituency: Jadavpur
- Vidhan Sabha constituency: Baruipur Purba (SC)
- Website: www.s24pgs.gov.in

Solgohalia is a census town within the jurisdiction of the Baruipur police station in the Baruipur CD block in the Baruipur subdivision of the South 24 Parganas district in the Indian state of West Bengal.

== Geography ==
Cities and towns in the southern part of Baruipur subdivision (including Baruipur, Jaynagar I & II, Kultali CD blocks) in South 24 Parganas district
M: municipal city/ town, CT: census town, R: rural/ urban centre, N: neighbourhood, H: historical place/ religious centre
Places linked with coastal activity are marked in blue
Owing to space constraints in the small map, the actual locations in a larger map may vary slightly

=== Area overview ===
Baruipur subdivision is a rural subdivision with moderate levels of urbanization. 31.05% of the population lives in the urban areas and 68.95% lives in the rural areas. In the southern portion of the subdivision (shown in the map alongside) there are 20 census towns. The entire district is situated in the Ganges Delta and the southern part is covered by the Baruipur-Jaynagar Plain. Archaeological excavations at Dhosa and Tilpi, on the bank of the Piyali River, indicate the existence of human habitation around 2,000 years ago.

Note: The map alongside presents some of the notable locations in the subdivision. All places marked in the map are linked in the larger full screen map.

=== Location ===
Solgohalia is located at 22°23′44″N 88°30′55″E. It has an average elevation of 9 metres (30 ft).

Garia, Champahati, Solgohalia and Naridana form a cluster of census towns in the Baruipur CD block, as per the map of the Baruipur CD block in the District Census Handbook for the South 24 Parganas.

Another cluster of census towns Kalaria, Gaur Daha and Banshra in the Canning I CD block is adjacent to the above cluster, as per the map of the Canning I CD block on page 333 of the District Census Handbook.

== Demographics ==
According to the 2011 Census of India, Solgohalia had a total population of 9,373, of which 4,724 (50%) were males and 4,649 (50%) were females. There were 1,051 persons in the age range of 0 to 6 years. The total number of literate persons in Solgohalia was 6,414 (77.07% of the population over 6 years).

== Infrastructure ==
According to the District Census Handbook 2011, Solgohalia covered an area of 2.6952 km^{2}. Among the civic amenities, it had 40 km roads with open drains, the protected water supply involved tap water from treated and untreated sources. It had 1,050 domestic electric connections. Among the educational facilities it had were 3 primary schools, 1 secondary school, the nearest senior secondary school was at Champahati. It had 3 non-formal education centres (Sarba Siksha Abhiyan). Among the social, recreational and cultural facilities, it had 2 public libraries. Among the important commodities it produced were fire works and beedi.

== Social scenario ==
According to the District Human Development Report for the South 24 Parganas, “The district is typically at the lower rung of the ladder in terms of district per capita income compared to other districts of West Bengal… This place also houses the largest proportion of backward people compared to the state… So far as the crime scenario is concerned the economically weaker group, i.e. the women and children, suffer the most in this district.”

== Transport ==
A short stretch of local roads link Solgohalia to the Baruipur-Champahati Road.

Piali railway station is located nearby.

== Education ==
=== Ashar Alo ===
Ashar Alo (literally meaning Ray of Hope) is a small school with a big difference, at Piali, Solgohalia, PO Kalaria. The school operates from KG to class VII, and teaches about 100 students. It moved into its own building in 2014. The school provides all students with breakfast and lunch, school uniform and all school requirements. They receive a hygiene kit every month, including toothpaste and shampoo, and also get medical attention. The students pay a token Rs. 20 per month. After completing schooling here, they join a high school and Ashar Alo continues to support them.

The school was a dream project of Anup Gayen, who spent his childhood in a missionary home for the under-privileged in Berhampore, and a Slovenian national Mojca Pijk. Anup was working for a social service organisation in the South 24 Parganas district, and Mojca had come to India with a passion for social service. They met, married and built this school, with funds coming in mostly from donors in Slovenia and Germany, primarily as a result of the efforts of Mojca. It was a great day for them when the Slovenian ambassador Jozef Drofenik visited Ashar Alo in 2018.

=== Other institutions ===
Kalaria Junior High School is a Bengali-medium coeducation institution established in 2010. It has facilities for teaching from class V to class VIII.

== Healthcare ==
Hariharpur Block Primary Health Centre, with 10 beds, at Hariharpur (PO Mallikpur), is the major government medical facility in the Baruipur CD block.
