= Piali =

Piali could refer to:

- Piali Pasha (c. 1515 – 1578), Ottoman admiral and vizier
- Piali railway station, a train station in West Bengal, India
- Piali (village), a village in West Bengal, India
