= Champahati =

- Census Town
- Location in West Bengal Location in India
- Coordinates: 22.4043°N 88.4937°E
- Country: India
- State: West Bengal
- District: South 24 Parganas
- CD block: Baruipur

Area
  - Total: 2.18 km^{2} (0.84 sq mi)
- Elevation: 9 m (30 ft)

Population (2011)
  - Total: 12,111
  - Density: 5,560/km^{2} (14,400/sq mi)

Languages
  - Official: Bengali
  - Additional official: English
- Time zone: UTC+5:30 (IST)
- PIN: 743330
- Telephone code: +91 33
- Vehicle registration: WB-19 to WB-22, WB-95 to WB-99
- Lok Sabha constituency: Jadavpur
- Vidhan Sabha constituency: Baruipur Purba (SC)
- Website: www.champahatigrampanchayat.org

Champahati is a census town in and a gram panchayat within the jurisdiction of the Baruipur police station in the Baruipur CD block in the Baruipur subdivision of the South 24 Parganas district in the Indian state of West Bengal. It is a part of Kolkata Urban Agglomeration.

== Geography ==
Cities and towns in the southern part of Baruipur subdivision (including Baruipur, Jaynagar I & II, Kultali CD blocks) in South 24 Parganas district
M: municipal city/ town, CT: census town, R: rural/ urban centre, N: neighbourhood, H: historical place/ religious centre
Places linked with coastal activity are marked in blue
Owing to space constraints in the small map, the actual locations in a larger map may vary slightly

=== Area overview ===
Baruipur subdivision is a rural subdivision with moderate levels of urbanization. 31.05% of the population lives in urban areas and 68.95% lives in rural areas. In the southern portion of the subdivision (shown in the map alongside) there are 20 census towns. The entire district is situated in the Ganges Delta and the southern part is covered by the Baruipur-Jaynagar Plain. Archaeological excavations at Dhosa and Tilpi, on the bank of the Piyali River indicate the existence of human habitation around 2,000 years ago.

Note: The map alongside presents some of the notable locations in the subdivision. All places marked in the map are linked in the larger full screen map.

=== Location ===
Champahati is located at 22°24′15″N 88°29′37″E. It has an average elevation of 9 metres (30 ft).

Garia, Champahati, Solgohalia and Naridana form a cluster of census towns in the Baruipur CD block, as per the map of the Baruipur CD block in the District Census Handbook for the South 24 Parganas.

Another cluster of census towns Kalaria, Gaur Daha and Banshra in the Canning I CD block is adjacent to the above cluster, as per the map of the Canning I CD block on page 333 of the District Census Handbook.

== Demographics ==
According to the 2011 Census of India, Champahati had a total population of 12,111, of which 6,052 (50%) were males and 6,069 (50%) were females. There were 1,068 persons in the age range of 0 to 6 years. The total number of literate persons in Champahati was 9,211 (83.41% of the population over 6 years).

== Infrastructure ==
According to the District Census Handbook 2011, Champahati covered an area of 2.1771 km^{2}. Among the physical aspects, Champahati railway station is in the town. Among the civic amenities, it had 30 km roads with both open and covered drains, the protected water supply involved tap water from treated and untreated sources. It had 1,500 domestic electric connections. Among the medical facilities it had 1 dispensary/ health centre, 1 charitable hospital/ nursing home and 3 medicine shops. Among the educational facilities it had were 7 primary schools, 2 senior secondary schools. It had 1 non-formal education centre (Sarba Siksha Abhiyan). Among the social, recreational and cultural facilities, it had 1 old age home, 1 cinema theatre, 2 public libraries. Among the important commodities it produced were crackers and biri. It had the branch offices of 2 nationalised banks.

== Transport ==
Subhashgram-Champahati Road links Champahati to the State Highway 1.

Champahati railway station is on the Sealdah–Canning line of the Kolkata Suburban Railway system.

=== Commuters ===
With the electrification of the railways, suburban traffic has grown tremendously since the 1960s. As of 2005–06, more than 1.7 million (17 lakhs) commuters use the Kolkata Suburban Railway system daily. After the partition of India, refugees from erstwhile East Pakistan and Bangladesh had a strong impact on the development of urban areas in the periphery of Kolkata. The new immigrants depended on Kolkata for their livelihood, thus increasing the number of commuters. Eastern Railway runs 1,272 EMU trains daily.

== Education ==
Sushil Kar College, established in 1968, is affiliated to the University of Calcutta. It offers honours courses in Bengali, English, Sanskrit, education, history, philosophy, political science, physics, chemistry, mathematics and accountancy, and general courses in arts, science and commerce.

South Calcutta Polytechnic College, is a prominent institution affiliated with the West Bengal State Council of Technical Education (WBSCTE). Located in Champahati, West Bengal.

Champahati Girls High School is a Bengali-medium girls only high school, established in 1961. It has facilities for teaching from class V to class XII.

Champahati Nilmoni Kar Vidyalalya.

== Healthcare ==
Hariharpur Block Primary Health Centre, with 10 beds, at Hariharpur (PO Mallikpur), is the major government medical facility in the Baruipur CD block.
