= Garia, Baruipur =

Garia
- Census Town
- Location in West Bengal Location in India
- Coordinates: 22.4026°N 88.4707°E
- Country: India
- State: West Bengal
- District: South 24 Parganas
- CD block: Baruipur

Area
  - Total: 1.95 km^{2} (0.75 sq mi)
- Elevation: 9 m (30 ft)

Population (2011)
  - Total: 4,805
  - Density: 2,460/km^{2} (6,380/sq mi)

Languages
  - Official: Bengali
  - Additional official: English
- Time zone: UTC+5:30 (IST)
- PIN: 743613
- Telephone code: +91 33
- Vehicle registration: WB-19 to WB-22, WB-95 to WB-99
- Lok Sabha constituency: Jadavpur
- Vidhan Sabha constituency: Baruipur Purba (SC)
- Website: www.s24pgs.gov.in

Garia is a census town and a gram panchayat within the jurisdiction of the Baruipur police station in the Baruipur CD block in the Baruipur subdivision of the South 24 Parganas district in the Indian state of West Bengal.

== Geography ==
Cities and towns in the southern part of Baruipur subdivision (including Baruipur, Jaynagar I & II, Kultali CD blocks) in South 24 Parganas district
M: municipal city/ town, CT: census town, R: rural/ urban centre, N: neighbourhood, H: historical place/ religious centre
Places linked with coastal activity are marked in blue
Owing to space constraints in the small map, the actual locations in a larger map may vary slightly

=== Area overview ===
Baruipur subdivision is a rural subdivision with moderate levels of urbanization. 31.05% of the population lives in the urban areas and 68.95% lives in the rural areas. In the southern portion of the subdivision (shown in the map alongside) there are 20 census towns. The entire district is situated in the Ganges Delta and the southern part is covered by the Baruipur-Jaynagar Plain. Archaeological excavations at Dhosa and Tilpi, on the bank of the Piyali River indicate the existence of human habitation around 2,000 years ago.

Note: The map alongside presents some of the notable locations in the subdivision. All places marked in the map are linked in the larger full screen map.

=== Location ===
Garia is located at 22°24′09″N 88°28′15″E. It has an average elevation of 9 metres (30 ft).

Garia, Champahati, Solgohalia and Naridana form a cluster of census towns in Baruipur CD block, as per the map of the Baruipur CD block in the District Census Handbook for the South 24 Parganas.

Another cluster of census towns Kalaria, Gaur Daha and Banshra in the Canning I CD block is adjacent to the above cluster, as per the map of the Canning I CD block on page 333 of the District Census Handbook.

== Demographics ==
According to the 2011 Census of India, Garia had a total population of 4,805, of which 2,410 (50%) were males and 2,395 (50%) were females. There were 357 persons in the age range of 0 to 6 years. The total number of literate persons in Garia was 4,035 (90.71% of the population over 6 years).

== Infrastructure ==
According to the District Census Handbook 2011, Garia covered an area of 1.9504 km^{2}. Among the civic amenities, it had 5 km roads with both open and covered drains, the protected water supply involved tube well/ bore well and covered wells. It had 1,420 domestic electric connections and 32 road light points. Among the medical facilities it had dispensary/ health centre 1 km away and family welfare centre 1 km away, 2 charitable hospitals/ nursing homes and 5 medicine shops in the town. Among the educational facilities it had were 3 primary schools, 2 middle schools, 2 secondary school, 2 secondary schools. Among the social, recreational and cultural facilities, it had 1 old age home, 1 public library and 1 reading room. It had the branch of 1 nationalised bank.

== Transport ==
Subhashgram-Champahati Road links Garia to the State Highway 1.

Kalikapur railway station is located nearby.

== Education ==
Amiyabala Balika Bidyalaya is a Bengali-medium girls only school established in 1931. It has facilities for teaching from class V to class XII.

South Garia Jadunath Vidyamandir.

== Healthcare ==
Hariharpur Block Primary Health Centre, with 10 beds, at Hariharpur (PO Mallikpur), is the major government medical facility in the Baruipur CD block.
