= Banshra, Canning =

Banshra
- Census Town
- Location in West Bengal Location in India
- Coordinates: 22.3685°N 88.5492°E
- Country: India
- State: West Bengal
- District: South 24 Parganas
- CD block: Canning I

Area
  - Total: 7.20 km^{2} (2.78 sq mi)
- Elevation: 6 m (20 ft)

Population (2011)
  - Total: 29,521
  - Density: 4,100/km^{2} (10,600/sq mi)

Languages
  - Official: Bengali
  - Additional official: English
- Time zone: UTC+5:30 (IST)
- PIN: 743363
- Telephone code: +91 3218
- Vehicle registration: WB-19 to WB-22, WB-95 to WB-99
- Lok Sabha constituency: Jaynagar (SC)
- Vidhan Sabha constituency: Canning Paschim (SC)
- Website: www.s24pgs.gov.in

Banshra is a census town and a gram panchayat within the jurisdiction of the Jibantala police station in the Canning I CD block in the Canning subdivision of the South 24 Parganas district in the Indian state of West Bengal.

== Geography ==
Places in Canning subdivision (Canning I & II, Basanti, Gosaba CD blocks) in South 24 Parganas district
R: rural/ urban centre
Places linked with coastal activity are marked in blue
Owing to space constraints in the small map, the actual locations in a larger map may vary slightly

=== Area overview ===
Canning subdivision has a very low level of urbanization. Only 12.37% of the population lives in the urban areas and 87.63% lives in the rural areas. There are 8 census towns in Canning I CD block and only 2 in the rest of the subdivision. The entire district is situated in the Ganges Delta with numerous islands in the southern part of the region. The area (shown in the map alongside) borders on the Sundarbans National Park and a major portion of it is a part of the Sundarbans settlements. It is a flat low-lying area in the South Bidyadhari plains. The Matla River is prominent and there are many streams and water channels locally known as khals. A comparatively recent country-wide development is the guarding of the coastal areas with a special coastal force.

Note: The map alongside presents some of the notable locations in the subdivision. All places marked in the map are linked in the larger full screen map.

=== Location ===
Banshra is located at 22.3685°N 88.5492°E

Kalaria, Gaur Daha and Banshra form a cluster of census towns in Canning I CD block, as per the map of the Canning I CD block on page 333 of the District Census Handbook. Ghutiari Sharif is not identified as a separate place in the 2011 census and is considered to be a part of Banshra mouza.

Another cluster of census towns formed by Garia, Champahati, Solgohalia and Naridana, in the Baruipur CD block, is adjacent to the above cluster, as per the map of the Baruipur CD block in the District Census Handbook for the South 24 Parganas.

== Demographics ==
According to the 2011 Census of India, Banshra had a total population of 29,521, of which 14,814 (50%) were males and 14,707 (50%) were females. There were 3,548 persons in the age range of 0 to 6 years. The total number of literate persons in Banshra was 19,909 (76.65% of the population over 6 years).

== Infrastructure ==
According to the District Census Handbook 2011, Banshra covered an area of 7.1956 km^{2}. Among the civic amenities, it had 9 km roads, the protected water supply involved overhead tank and service reservoir. It had 371 domestic electric connections. Among the medical facilities it had 7 maternity and child welfare centres, a nursing home 1 km away, a veterinary hospital close by. Among the educational facilities it had were 10 primary schools and 1 senior secondary school. Among the industry and banking facilities, it had the branch of 1 nationalised bank.

== Transport ==
Banshra is on the Piyali-Ghutiari Sharif Road.

Ghutiari Sharif railway station is located nearby.

== Education ==
Ghutiari Sharif BM Vidyapith is a Bengali-medium boys only institution established in 1963. It has arrangements for teaching from class V to class X.

Ghutiary Sharif Bailka Vidyalaya is a Bengali-medium girls institution established in 1970. It has facilities for teaching from class V to class XII.

Laxhminarayan High School is a Bengali-medium coeducational institution established in 2010. It has facilities for teaching from class VI to class VIII.

== Culture ==
=== Ghutiari Sharif ===
Ghutiari Sharif, a hamlet in the Banshra mouza, has the dargah of Pir Mobarak Ghazi, a sacred place for Muslims. People of all religions visit the dargah and offer prayers. It is believed that Ghazi had powers to protect wood-cutters and honey-collectors from the danger of the jungles. Such people offer prayers to Ghazi before entering the jungles. Pir Mobarak Ghazi's tales are mentioned in the medieval Hindu ballad Raymangal and the late medieval ballad Banabibir Jahuranama.

== Healthcare ==
Ghutiari Sharif Block Primary Health Centre at Ghutiari Sharif, with 10 beds, is the major government medical facility in the Canning I CD block.
