= Gaur Daha =

Gourdaha Gaur Daha
- Census Town
- Location in West Bengal Location in India
- Coordinates: 22.3785°N 88.5300°E
- Country: India
- State: West Bengal
- District: South 24 Parganas
- CD block: Canning I

Area
  - Total: 3.07 km^{2} (1.19 sq mi)
- Elevation: 6 m (20 ft)

Population (2011)
  - Total: 5,260
  - Density: 1,710/km^{2} (4,440/sq mi)

Languages
  - Official: Bengali
  - Additional official: English
- Time zone: UTC+5:30 (IST)
- PIN: 743363
- Telephone code: +91 3218
- Vehicle registration: WB-19 to WB-22, WB-95 to WB-99
- Lok Sabha constituency: Jaynagar (SC)
- Vidhan Sabha constituency: Canning Paschim (SC)
- Website: www.s24pgs.gov.in

Gaur Daha or Gourdaha is a census town within the jurisdiction of the Jibantala police station in the Canning I CD block in the Canning subdivision of the proposed Sundarbans district and till now in South 24 Parganas district in the Indian state of West Bengal. It is a part of Kolkata Urban Agglomeration.

It is bordered by the neighborhoods of Narayanpur in the north, Piyali or Kalaria in the west, Banshra in the east and Kalabaru in the south. Gourdaha Canal flows through Gourdaha, which joins Piali River at Uttar Bhag.

The middle part of the Baruipur to Canning Road and the eastern part of the Sonarpur to Ghutiari Sharrif Road runs through respectively the South and North of the neighborhood. The area contains a prominent traffic junction from which a variety of public transport is available, making it a prime travel connection spot in suburbs area.

== Geography ==
Places in Canning subdivision (Canning I & II, Basanti, Gosaba CD blocks) in South 24 Parganas district
R: rural/ urban centre
Places linked with coastal activity are marked in blue
Owing to space constraints in the small map, the actual locations in a larger map may vary slightly

=== Area overview ===
Canning subdivision has a very low level of urbanization. Only 12.37% of the population lives in the urban areas and 87.63% lives in the rural areas. There are 8 census towns in Canning I CD block and only 2 in the rest of the subdivision. The entire district is situated in the Ganges Delta with numerous islands in the southern part of the region. The area (shown in the map alongside) borders on the Sundarbans National Park and a major portion of it is a part of the Sundarbans settlements. It is a flat low-lying area in the South Bidyadhari plains. The Matla River is prominent and there are many streams and water channels locally known as khals. A comparatively recent country-wide development is the guarding of the coastal areas with a special coastal force.

Note: The map alongside presents some of the notable locations in the subdivision. All places marked in the map are linked in the larger full screen map.

=== Location ===
Gaur Daha is located at 22°22′43″N 88°31′48″E. It has an average elevation of 6 metres (20 ft).

Kalaria, Gaur Daha and Banshra form a cluster of census towns in the Canning I CD block, as per the map of the Canning I CD block on page 333 of the District Census Handbook.

Another cluster of census towns formed by Garia, Champahati, Solgohalia and Naridana, in the Baruipur CD block, is adjacent to the above cluster, as per the map of the Baruipur CD block in the District Census Handbook for South 24 Parganas.

== Demographics ==
According to the 2011 Census of India, Gaur Daha had a total population of 5,260, of which 2,708 (51%) were males and 2,552 (49%) were females. There were 611 persons in the age range of 0 to 6 years. The total number of literate persons in Gaur Daha was 3,373 (72.55% of the population over 6 years).

== Infrastructure ==
According to the District Census Handbook 2011, Gaur Daha covered an area of 3.0674 km^{2}. Among the civic amenities, it had 5 km roads, the protected water supply involved overhead tank and service reservoir. It had 179 domestic electric connections. Among the medical facilities it had 6 dispensaries/ health centres. Among the educational facilities it had were 2 primary schools and 2 senior secondary schools.

== Transport ==
Gaur Daha is on the Piyali-Ghutiari Sharif Road or Ghutiari Sharrif Highway. It also connected with Baruipur to Canning Road by Gourdaha-Kalabaru Road and connected with Sonarpur to Ghutiari Sharrif Road by Gourdaha-Narayanpur Road

Gourdaha Halt railway station is on the Sealdah–Canning line of the Kolkata Suburban Railway system.

=== Commuters ===
With the electrification of the railways, suburban traffic has grown tremendously since the 1960s. As of 2005–06, more than 1.7 million (17 lakhs) commuters use the Kolkata Suburban Railway system daily. After the partition of India, refugees from East Pakistan/ Bangladesh had a strong impact on the development of urban areas in the periphery of Kolkata. The new immigrants depended on Kolkata for their livelihood, thus increasing the number of commuters. Eastern Railway runs 32 pairs EMU trains daily.

== Tourist spot ==
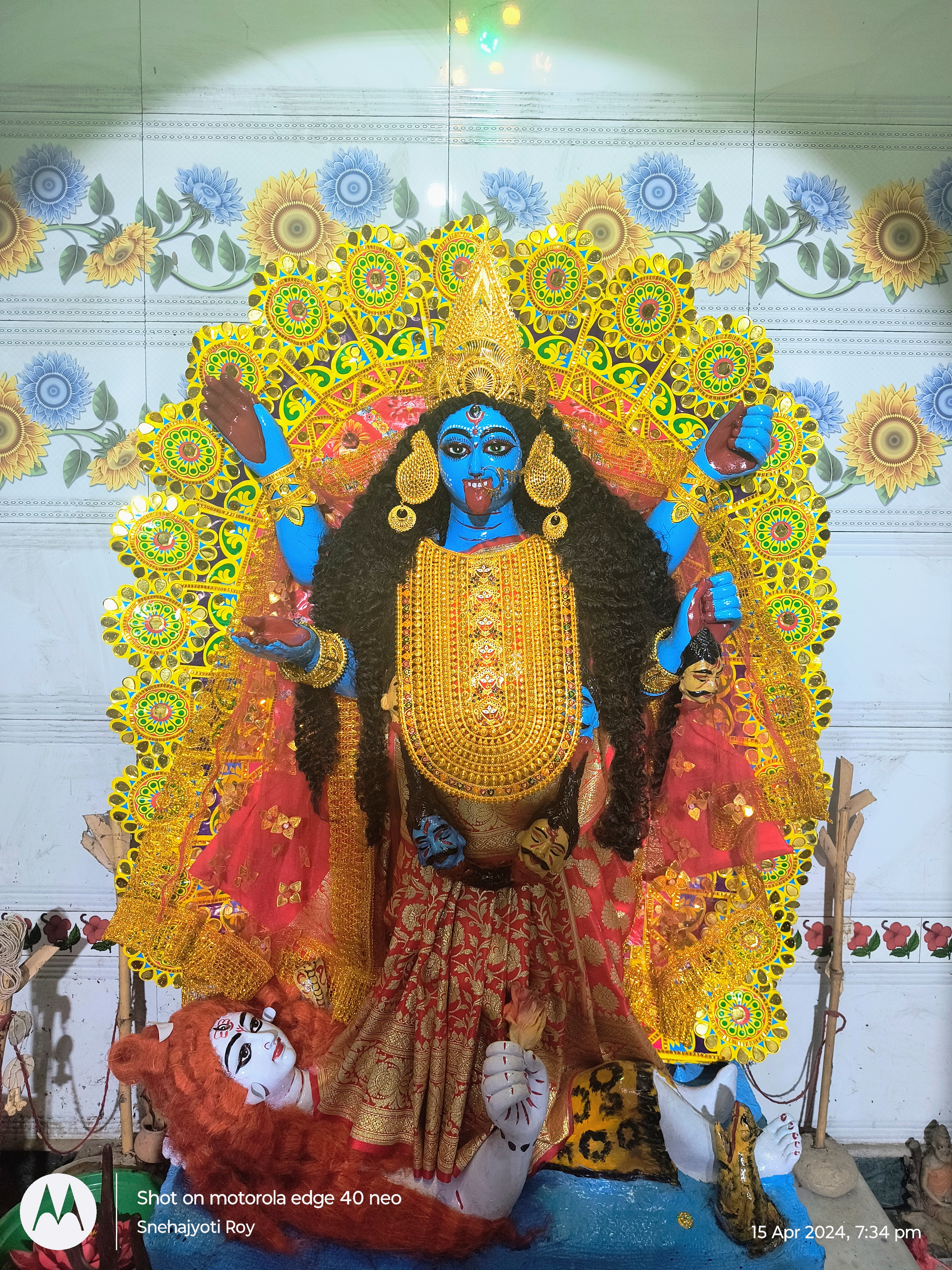
Gourdaha Maa Kali Temple, Goddess Kali Idol

• Gourdaha Kali Bari or Gourdaha Maa Kali Mandir is a famous temple in Gourdaha, Canning. 2 minutes from Gourdaha Railway Station.

• Gourdaha Nilkantheswar Temple, near Gourdaha Railway Station, opposite of Gourdaha Kali Bari

== Education ==
• Canning Government Polytechnic is a new government polytechnic at Gourdaha (Near Sonarpur and Canning Town) in the South 24 Parganas District of West Bengal. It is located in a pollution free, eco-friendly environment at Narayanpur of Canning I block. The institute was started in 2019 with three branches of diploma in engineering i.e. Computer Science and Technology, Electrical Engineering and Renewable Energy. Institute intends to develop engineers who are not only sensitive to technical issues but also able to apply their analytical, creative and innovative skills and ideas to shoulder leadership, responsibility in business, service and manufacturing organizations. The college is affiliated to West Bengal State Council of Technical Education and Skill Development and is approved by AICTE.

== High school ==
• Lakhsminarayanpur Vidyamandir High School is a Bengali-medium coeducational institution established in 2010. It has facilities for teaching from class VI to class VIII.

• Narayanpur Akshay Vidyamandir High School is a Bengali-medium coeducational school. It was established in 1912 and has facilities for teaching from class V to class XII.

• Kalabaru High School is a Bengali-medium coeducational school. It was established in 1958 and has facilities for teaching from class V to class XII.

• Hari-Har Mahavidyalaya is a Bengali-medium school. It was established in 1933 and has facilities for teaching from class XI to class XII.

== Primary education ==
• Gourdaha Kuhu Keka Primary School is a Bengali-medium government coeducational school. It was established in 1976 and has facilities for teaching from Kindergarten to class IV.

• Gourdaha Dinanath Smriti Vidyamandir is an English-medium coeducational school. It was established in 2016 and has facilities for teaching from Kindergarten to class IV.

• Gourdaha Primary School is a Bengali-medium government coeducational school. It was established in 1994 and has facilities for teaching from Kindergarten to class IV.

• Gourdaha Pather Sesh Primary School is a Bengali-medium government coeducational school. It was established in 1984 and has facilities for teaching from Kindergarten to class IV.

• Karkhanar Chok Primary School is a Bengali-medium government coeducational school. It was established in 1990 and has facilities for teaching from Kindergarten to class IV.

• Kalabaru Primary School is a Bengali-medium government coeducational school. It was established in 1987 and has facilities for teaching from Kindergarten to class IV.

• St. Stefan Christian School is English-medium coeducational school. It was established in 2002 and has facilities for teaching from Kindergarten to class IV.

== Healthcare ==
• Ghutiari Sharif Block Primary Health Centre at Ghutiari Sharif, with 10 beds, is the major government medical facility in the Canning I CD block.
