= Kalaria =

- Census Town
- Location in West Bengal Location in India
- Coordinates: 22.3855°N 88.5198°E
- Country: India
- State: West Bengal
- District: South 24 Parganas
- CD block: Canning I

Area
  - Total: 4.17 km^{2} (1.61 sq mi)
- Elevation: 6 m (20 ft)

Population (2011)
  - Total: 10,075
  - Density: 2,420/km^{2} (6,260/sq mi)

Languages
  - Official: Bengali
  - Additional official: English
- Time zone: UTC+5:30 (IST)
- PIN: 743363
- Telephone code: +91 3218
- Vehicle registration: WB-19 to WB-22, WB-95 to WB-99
- Lok Sabha constituency: Jaynagar (SC)
- Vidhan Sabha constituency: Canning Paschim (SC)
- Website: www.s24pgs.gov.in

Kalaria is a census town within the jurisdiction of the Canning police station in the Canning I CD block in the Canning subdivision of the South 24 Parganas district in the Indian state of West Bengal. It is a part of Kolkata Urban Agglomeration.

== Geography ==
Places in Canning subdivision (Canning I & II, Basanti, Gosaba CD blocks) in South 24 Parganas district
R: rural/ urban centre
Places linked with coastal activity are marked in blue
Owing to space constraints in the small map, the actual locations in a larger map may vary slightly

=== Area overview ===
Canning subdivision has a very low level of urbanization. Only 12.37% of the population lives in the urban areas and 87.63% lives in the rural areas. There are 8 census towns in the Canning I CD block and only 2 in the rest of the subdivision. The entire district is situated in the Ganges Delta with numerous islands in the southern part of the region. The area (shown in the map alongside) borders on the Sundarbans National Park and a major portion of it is a part of the Sundarbans settlements. It is a flat low-lying area in the South Bidyadhari plains. The Matla River is prominent and there are many streams and water channels locally known as khals. A comparatively recent country-wide development is the guarding of the coastal areas with a special coastal force.

Note: The map alongside presents some of the notable locations in the subdivision. All places marked in the map are linked in the larger full screen map.

=== Location ===
Kalaria is located at 22.3855°N 88.5198°E.

Kalaria, Gaur Daha and Banshra form a cluster of census towns in the Canning I CD block, as per the map of the Canning I CD block on page 333 of District Census Handbook.

Another cluster of census towns formed by Garia, Champahati, Solgohalia and Naridana, in the Baruipur CD block, is adjacent to the above cluster, as per the map of the Baruipur CD block in the District Census Handbook for the South 24 Parganas.

== Demographics ==
According to the 2011 Census of India, Kalaria had a total population of 10,075, of which 5,079 (50%) were males and 4,996 (50%) were females. There were 1,188 persons in the age range of 0 to 6 years. The total number of literate persons in Kalaria was 7,091 (79.79% of the population over 6 years).

== Infrastructure ==
According to the District Census Handbook 2011, Kalaria covered an area of 4.173 km^{2}. Among the civic amenities, it had 5 km roads with both open and covered drains, the protected water supply involved overhead tank and service reservoir. It had 277 domestic electric connections. Among the medical facilities it had 1 dispensary/ health centre. Among the educational facilities it had were 2 primary schools.

== Transport ==
Kalaria is on the Piyali-Ghutiari Sharif Road.

Piali railway station is located nearby.

== Education ==
Kalaria Junior High School is a Bengali-medium coeducation institution established in 2010. It has facilities for teaching from class V to class VIII.

== Healthcare ==
Ghutiari Sharif Block Primary Health Centre at Ghutiari Sharif, with 10 beds, is the major government medical facility in the Canning I CD block.
