= Gourdaha Halt railway station =

Railway station in West Bengal, India

Gourdaha Halt
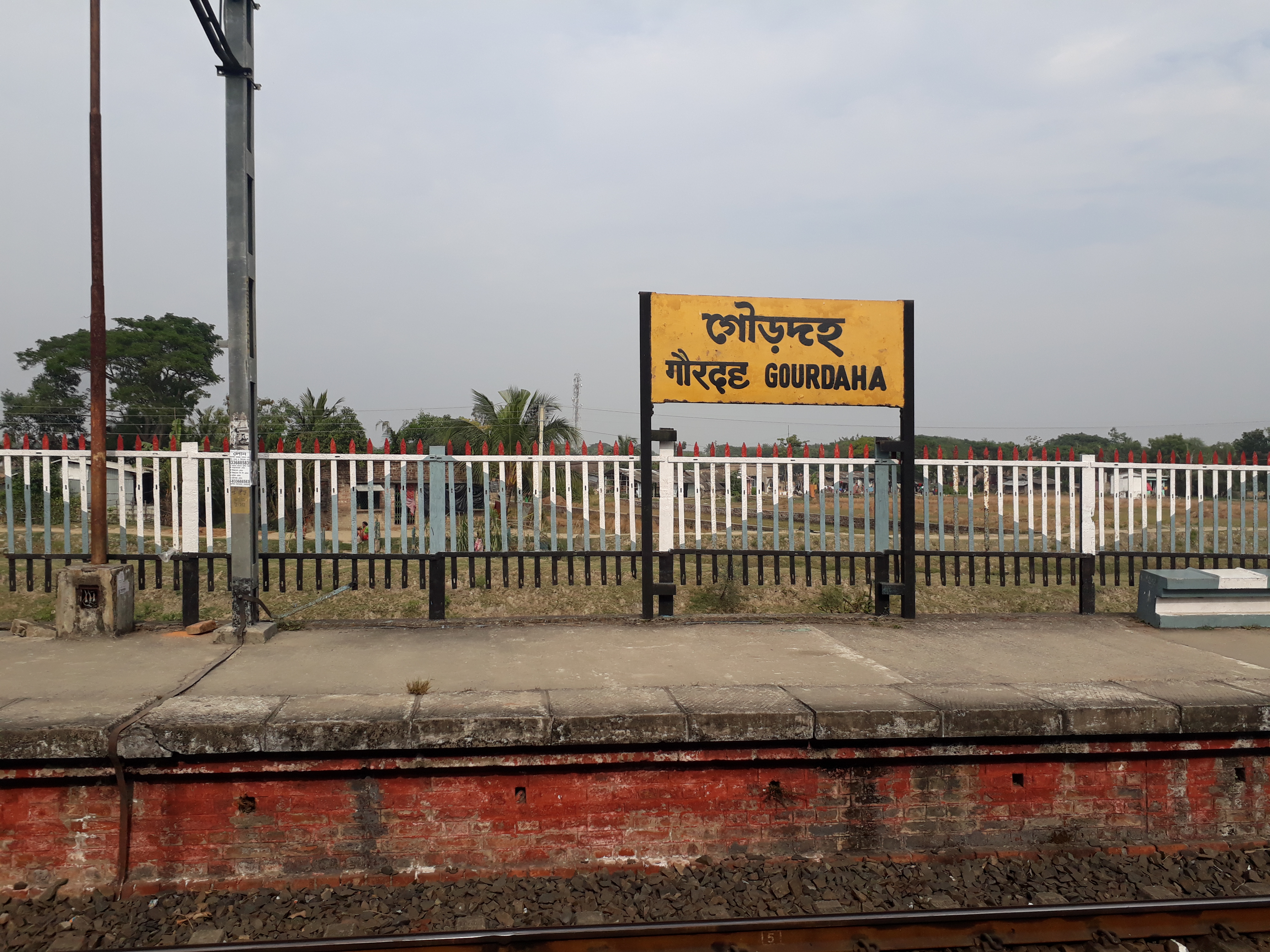
- Gourdaha Halt Railway Station

General information
- Location: Gourdaha, Gaur Daha, Canning I, South 24 Parganas, West Bengal; India
- Coordinates: 22.378294°N 88.534757°E
- Elevation: 6 metres (20 ft)
- System: Kolkata Suburban Railway Station
- Owner: Indian Railways
- Operator: Eastern Railway
- Line: Canning Branch line
- Platforms: 2
- Tracks: 2

Construction
- Structure type: Standard (on-ground station)
- Parking: Not Available
- Cycle facilities: Not Available
- Accessible: Not Available

Other information
- Status: Functioning
- Station code: GQD
- Zone(s): Eastern Railway
- Division(s): Sealdah

History
- Opened: 1862; 164 years ago
- Electrified: 1965–66
- Former names: Eastern Bengal Railway
Services
Preceding station	Kolkata Suburban Railway	Following station
Ghutiari Sharif towards Canning	Sealdah South Canning Branch line	Piali towards Sealdah
Route map
Location

Gourdaha Halt railway station is a Kolkata Suburban Railway Station on the Canning Branch line. It is under the jurisdiction of the Sealdah railway division in the Eastern Railway zone of the Indian Railways. It serves the local area of Gaur Daha in South 24 Parganas district in the Indian state of West Bengal.

== History ==
In 1862, the Eastern Bengal Railway constructed a 1,676 mm (5 ft 6 in)-wide broad-gauge railway from Sonarpur Junction to Canning via Gourdaha Halt.

== Tourist spot ==
Gourdaha Maa Kali Temple is a temple in Gourdaha, Canning. It is close to Gourdaha Railway Station beside a holy pond. Though it doesn't have any amenities like that of a tourist spot. You can sit there and enjoy the serenity. It is very "Jagroto". Lots of ill peoples visit Tuesday and Saturday at noon to seek blessings from the Goddess.

== Electrification ==
Electrification from Sonarpur Junction to Canning including Gourdaha Halt was completed with 25 kV AC overhead system in 1965–66.

== Station complex ==
The platform is very much well sheltered. The station possesses many facilities including water and sanitation. There is a proper approach road to this station.

== Station layout ==
G	Street level	Exit/Entrance
P1	Side platform No- 1, doors will open on the left
P1		Towards →Piali→ →
P1		→Towards ←Ghutiari Sharif← ←
P1	Side platform No- 2, doors will open on the left
P2
