= Baruipur (P) =

- Census Town
- Location in West Bengal Location in India
- Coordinates: 22.3597°N 88.4438°E
- Country: India
- State: West Bengal
- District: South 24 Parganas
- CD block: Baruipur

Area
  - Total: 10.00 km^{2} (3.86 sq mi)
- Elevation: 9 m (30 ft)

Population (2011)
  - Total: 22,430
  - Density: 2,243/km^{2} (5,809/sq mi)

Languages
  - Official: Bengali
  - Additional official: English
- Time zone: UTC+5:30 (IST)
- PIN: 700144
- Telephone code: +91 33
- Vehicle registration: WB-19 to WB-22, WB-95 to WB-99
- Lok Sabha constituency: Jadavpur
- Vidhan Sabha constituency: Baruipur Paschim
- Website: www.s24pgs.gov.in

Baruipur is a census town within the jurisdiction of the Baruipur police station in the Baruipur CD block in the Baruipur subdivision of the South 24 Parganas district in the Indian state of West Bengal.

== Geography ==
Cities and towns in the southern part of Baruipur subdivision (including Baruipur, Jaynagar I & II, Kultali CD blocks) in South 24 Parganas district
M: municipal city/ town, CT: census town, R: rural/ urban centre, N: neighbourhood, H: historical place/ religious centre
Places linked with coastal activity are marked in blue
Owing to space constraints in the small map, the actual locations in a larger map may vary slightly

=== Area overview ===
Baruipur subdivision is a rural subdivision with moderate levels of urbanization. 31.05% of the population resides in the urban areas and 68.95% resides in the rural areas. In the southern portion of the subdivision (shown in the map alongside) there are 20 census towns. The entire district is situated in the Ganges Delta and the southern part is covered by the Baruipur-Jaynagar Plain. Archaeological excavations at Dhosa and Tilpi, on the bank of the Piyali River indicate the existence of human habitation around 2,000 years ago.

Note: The map alongside presents some of the notable locations in the subdivision. All places marked in the map are linked in the larger full screen map.

=== Location ===
Baruipur (CT) is located at 22°21′35″N 88°26′38″E.

Khodar Bazar on the west, Salipur on the north, Baruipur (CT) on the east are census towns adjacent to Baruipur city, and Komarhat is a little away on the south, as per the map of the Baruipur CD block in the District Census Handbook for the South 24 Parganas.

== Demographics ==
According to the 2011 Census of India, Baruipur (CT) had a total population of 22,430, of which 11,396 (51%) were males and 11,034 (49%) were females. There are 1943 persons in the age range of 0 to 6 years. The total number of literate persons in Baruipur (CT) was 17,251 (84.20% of the population over 6 years).

== Infrastructure ==
According to the District Census Handbook 2011, Baruipur (CT) covered an area of 10.0048 km^{2}. Among the civic amenities, it had 14 km roads with both open and covered drains, the protected water supply involved tap water from treated source and tube well/ bore well. It had 5,000 domestic electric connections and 300 road light points. Among the medical facilities it had hospital 1.5 km way, maternity and child welfare clinic 1 km away, nursing home 1 km away, 1 charitable hospital/ nursing home and 1 medicine shop in the town. Among the educational facilities it had were 17 primary schools, 1 middle school, 1 secondary school, 2 senior secondary schools. It had 1 special school for the disabled. Among the social, recreational and cultural facilities, it had 1 orphanage, 1 public library, 1 reading room. The three important commodities it produced were: surgical instruments, food products, shoes. It had the branch of a 1 nationalised bank.

== Transport ==
A short stretch of local roads link Baruipur (CT) to the State Highway 1.

Baruipur Junction railway station is located nearby.

== Education ==
Madarat Ishan Chandra Balika Vidyalaya is a Bengali-medium girls only institution established in 1963. It has facilities for teaching from class V to class XII. The school has a library with 945 books, a computer-aided learning lab with 13 computers and a play ground.

== Healthcare ==
Hariharpur Block Primary Health Centre, with 10 beds, at Hariharpur (PO Mallikpur), is the major government medical facility in the Baruipur CD block.
