= Salipur, Baruipur =

Salipur
- Census Town
- Location in West Bengal Location in India
- Coordinates: 22.3784°N 88.4295°E
- Country: India
- State: West Bengal
- District: South 24 Parganas
- CD block: Baruipur

Area
  - Total: 0.83 km^{2} (0.32 sq mi)
- Elevation: 9 m (30 ft)

Population (2011)
  - Total: 5,091
  - Density: 6,100/km^{2} (16,000/sq mi)

Languages
  - Official: Bengali
  - Additional official: English
- Time zone: UTC+5:30 (IST)
- PIN: 700144
- Telephone code: +91 33
- Vehicle registration: WB-19 to WB-22, WB-95 to WB-99
- Lok Sabha constituency: Jadavpur
- Vidhan Sabha constituency: Baruipur Paschim
- Website: www.s24pgs.gov.in

Salipur is a census town within the jurisdiction of the Baruipur police station in the Baruipur CD block in the Baruipur subdivision of the South 24 Parganas district in the Indian state of West Bengal.

== Geography ==
Cities and towns in the southern part of Baruipur subdivision (including Baruipur, Jaynagar I & II, Kultali CD blocks) in South 24 Parganas district
M: municipal city/ town, CT: census town, R: rural/ urban centre, N: neighbourhood, H: historical place/ religious centre
Places linked with coastal activity are marked in blue
Owing to space constraints in the small map, the actual locations in a larger map may vary slightly

=== Area overview ===
Baruipur subdivision is a rural subdivision with moderate levels of urbanization. 31.05% of the population lives in the urban areas and 68.95% lives in the rural areas. In the southern portion of the subdivision (shown in the map alongside) there are 20 census towns. The entire district is situated in the Ganges Delta and the southern part is covered by the Baruipur-Jaynagar Plain. Archaeological excavations at Dhosa and Tilpi, on the bank of the Piyali River indicate the existence of human habitation around 2,000 years ago.

Note: The map alongside presents some of the notable locations in the subdivision. All places marked in the map are linked in the larger full screen map.

=== Location ===
Salipur is located at 22°22′42″N 88°25′46″E. It has an average elevation of 9 metres (30 ft).

Khodar Bazar on the west, Salipur on the north, Baruipur (CT) on the east are census towns adjacent to Baruipur city, and Komarhat is a little away on the south, as per the map of the Baruipur CD block in the District Census Handbook for the South 24 Parganas.

== Demographics ==
According to the 2011 Census of India, Salipur had a total population of 5,091, of which 2,494 (51%) were males and 2,497 (49%) were females. There were 409 persons in the age range of 0 to 6 years. The total number of literate persons in Salipur was 4,119 (87.98% of the population over 6 years).

== Infrastructure ==
According to the District Census Handbook 2011, Salipur covered an area of 0.8331 km^{2}. Among the physical aspects, there is a railway station at Baruipur Junction 1.7 km away. Among the civic amenities, it had 6 km roads with open drains, the protected water supply involved hand pump and tap water from untreated source. It had 2,000 domestic electric connections. Among the medical facilities it had 1 dispensary/ health centre in the town and other medical facilities nearby. Among the educational facilities it had were 2 primary schools, the nearest secondary school, the nearest senior secondary school at Baruipur 1.5 km away. Among the social, recreational and cultural facilities, it had 1 orphanage in the town and 1 public library, 1 reading room at Dihi 1 km away. An important commodities it produced was: railway wagons.

== Transport ==
Salipur is on the State Highway 1.

Baruipur Junction railway station is located nearby.

== Healthcare ==
Hariharpur Block Primary Health Centre, with 10 beds, at Hariharpur (PO Mallikpur), is the major government medical facility in the Baruipur CD block.
