= Surjyapur railway station =

Railway station in West Bengal, India

Surjyapur
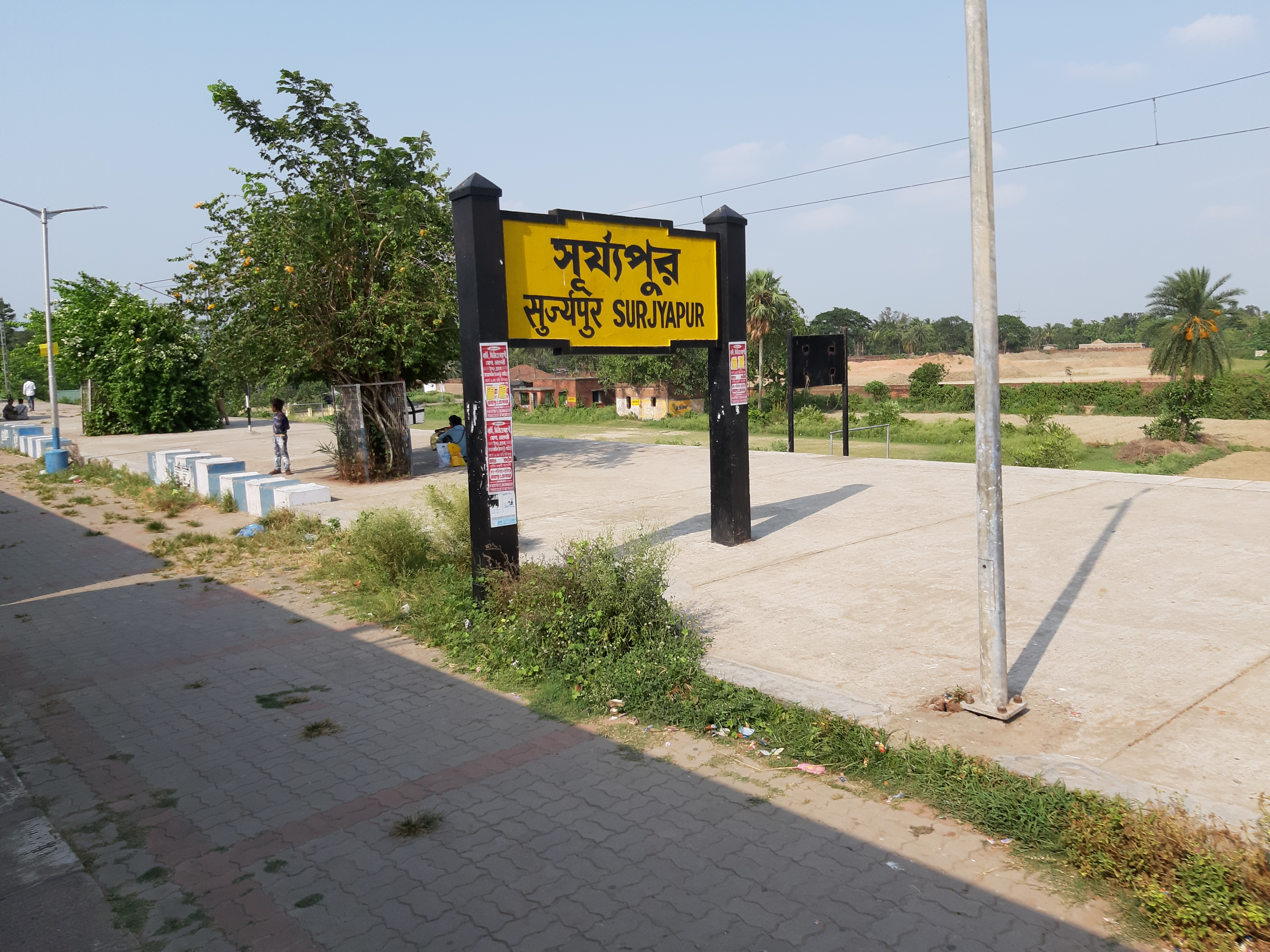
- Surjyapur Railway Station

General information
- Location: Baruipur-Kulpi Road, Nachangachha, Surjyapur Ghat, South 24 Parganas, West Bengal; India
- Coordinates: 22.293444°N 88.466671°E
- Elevation: 9 metres (30 ft)
- System: Kolkata Suburban Railway Station
- Owner: Indian Railways
- Operator: Eastern Railway
- Line: Main line
- Platforms: 2
- Tracks: 2

Construction
- Structure type: Standard (on-ground station)
- Parking: Not Available
- Cycle facilities: Not Available
- Accessible: Not Available

Other information
- Status: Functioning
- Station code: SJPR
- Zone(s): Eastern Railway
- Division(s): Sealdah

History
- Opened: 1882; 144 years ago
- Electrified: 1965–66
- Former names: Eastern Bengal Railway
Services
Preceding station	Kolkata Suburban Railway	Following station
Gocharan towards Namkhana	Sealdah South Main line	Dhapdhapi towards Sealdah
Route map
Location

Surjyapur railway station is a Kolkata Suburban Railway Station on the Main line. It is under the jurisdiction of the Sealdah railway division in the Eastern Railway zone of the Indian Railways. Surjyapur railway station is situated beside Baruipur-Kulpi Road, Nachangachha, Surjyapur Ghat, South 24 Parganas district in the Indian state of West Bengal.

== History ==
In 1882, the Eastern Bengal Railway constructed a 1,676 mm (5 ft 6 in)-wide broad-gauge railway from Sonarpur Junction to Jaynagar Majilpur via Surjyapur.

== Electrification ==
Electrification from Sonarpur Junction to Jaynagar Majilpur including Surjyapur was completed with 25 kV AC overhead system in 1965–66.

== Station complex ==
The platform is very much well sheltered. The station possesses many facilities including water and sanitation. It is well connected to the SH-1. There is a proper approach road to this station.
