= Shasan Road railway station =

Railway station in West Bengal, India

Shasan Road
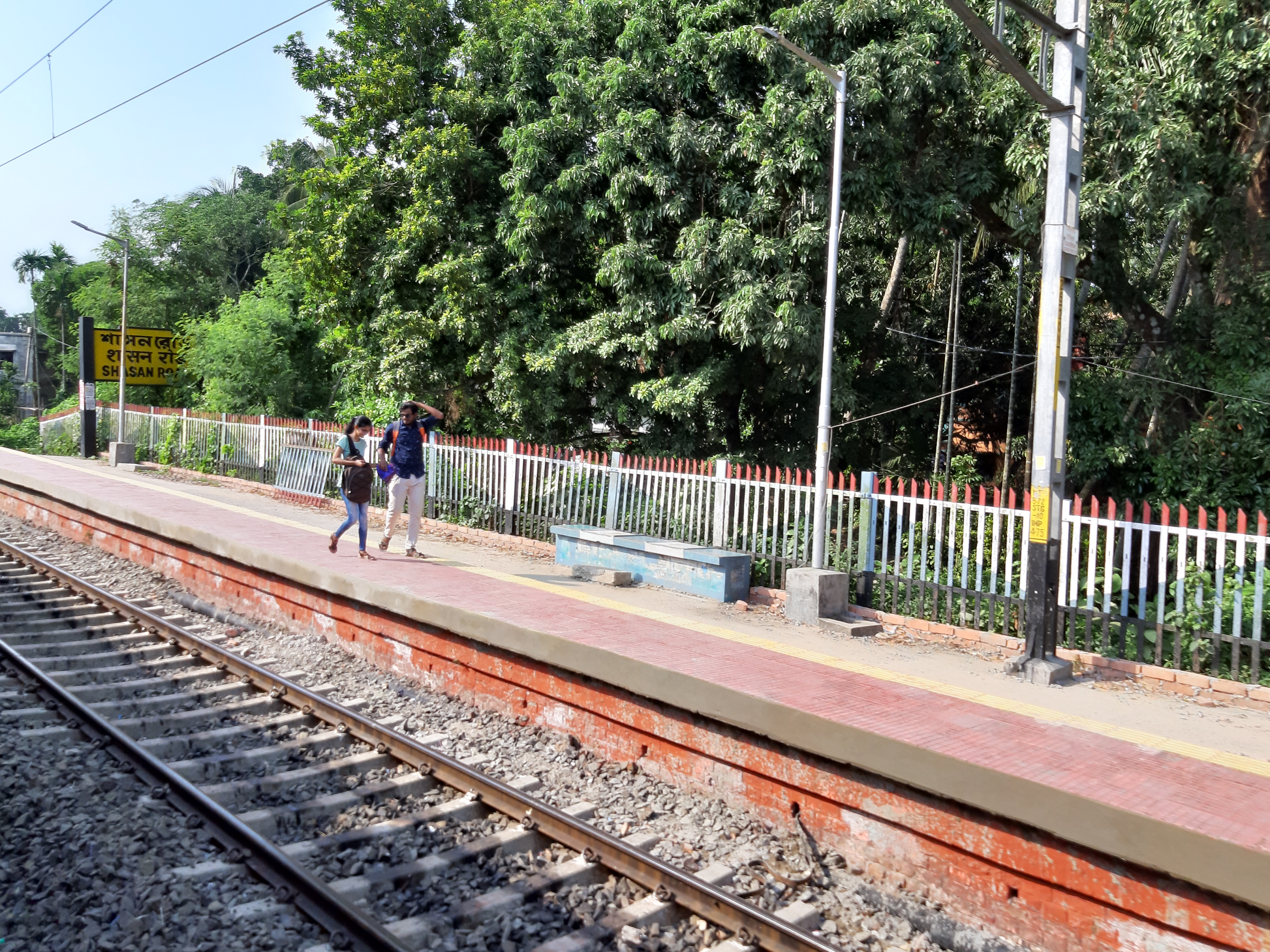
- Shasan Road Railway Station

General information
- Location: P. K. Banerjee Road, Baruipur, South 24 Parganas, West Bengal; India
- Coordinates: 22.347039°N 88.435059°E
- Elevation: 9 metres (30 ft)
- System: Kolkata Suburban Railway Station
- Owner: Indian Railways
- Operator: Eastern Railway
- Line: Main line
- Platforms: 2
- Tracks: 2

Construction
- Structure type: Standard (on-ground station)
- Parking: Not Available
- Cycle facilities: Not Available
- Accessible: Not Available

Other information
- Status: Functioning
- Station code: SSRD
- Zone(s): Eastern Railway
- Division(s): Sealdah

History
- Opened: 1882; 144 years ago
- Electrified: 1965–66
- Former names: Eastern Bengal Railway
Services
Preceding station	Kolkata Suburban Railway	Following station
Krishna Mohan towards Namkhana	Sealdah South Main line	Baruipur Junction towards Sealdah
Route map
Location

Shasan Road railway station is a Kolkata Suburban Railway Station on the Main line. It is under the jurisdiction of the Sealdah railway division in the Eastern Railway zone of the Indian Railways. Shasan Road railway station is situated beside P. K. Banerjee Road, Baruipur, South 24 Parganas district in the Indian state of West Bengal.

== History ==
In 1882, the Eastern Bengal Railway constructed a 1,676 mm (5 ft 6 in)-wide broad-gauge railway from Sonarpur Junction to Jaynagar Majilpur via Shasan Road.

== Electrification ==
Electrification from Sonarpur Junction to Jaynagar Majilpur including Shasan Road was completed with 25 kV AC overhead system in 1965–66.

== Station complex ==
The station has a public toilet and a well sheltered platform. It is accessible from the SH-1 via a high quality approach road.
