= Piali (village) =

- village
- Location in West Bengal, India
- Coordinates: 22.394464°N 88.514309°E
- Country: India
- State: West Bengal
- District: South 24 Parganas

Languages
  - Official: Bengali, English
- Time zone: UTC+5:30 (IST)
- PIN: 743387 (Piyali Town Post Office)
- Vehicle registration: WB
- Lok Sabha constituency: Jadavpur
- Vidhan Sabha constituency: Baruipur Purba Assembly constituency

Piali is a village in the Baruipur (community development block), under the Baruipur subdivision, South 24 Parganas, West Bengal, India.

== Overview ==
The headquarters of Baruipur Community Development Block are located in Piali

== Geography ==
Cities and towns in the southern part of Baruipur subdivision
M: municipal city/ town, CT: census town, N: neighbourhood
Owing to space constraints in the small map, the actual locations in a larger map may vary slightly

South 24-Parganas district in the southern part of the Ganges Delta is a relatively new land formed by alluvial deposits.

Piali is about 24 km from Kolkata .

== Education ==
Ashar Alo, a distinguished private school for rural children providing free education.

== Transport ==
Piali railway station is a Kolkata Suburban railway station on the Canning Branch line.

History
