= Baruipur =

City in West Bengal, India

- City
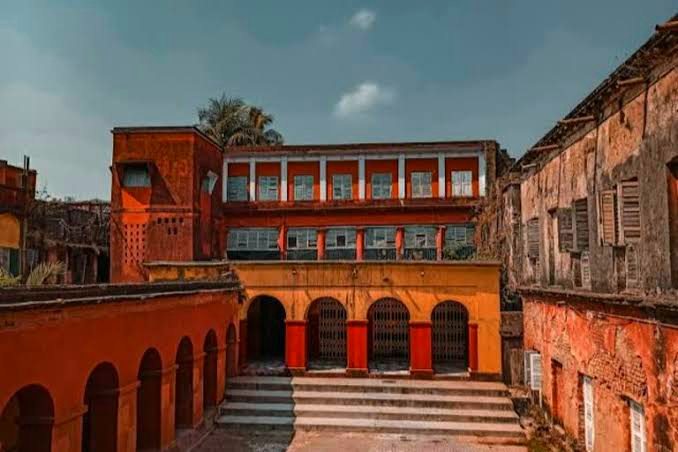
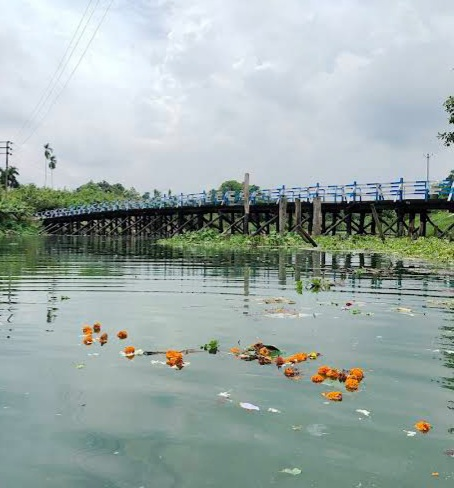
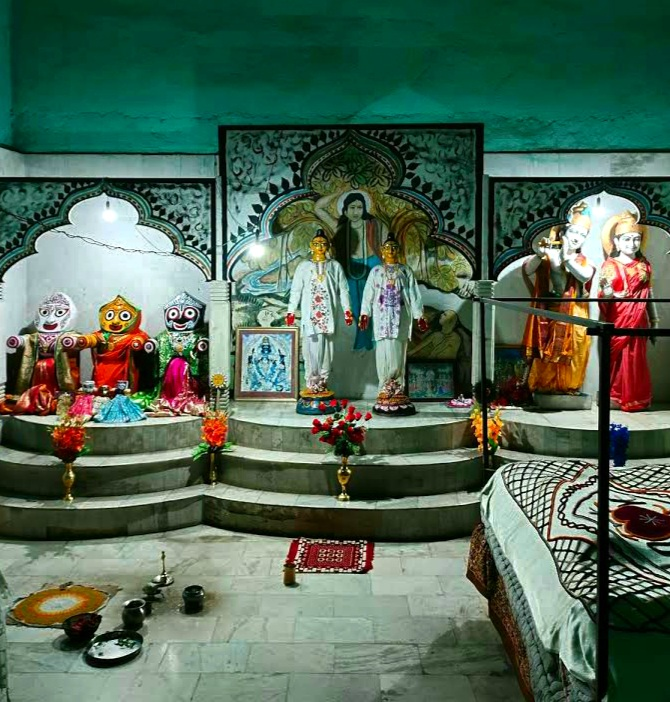
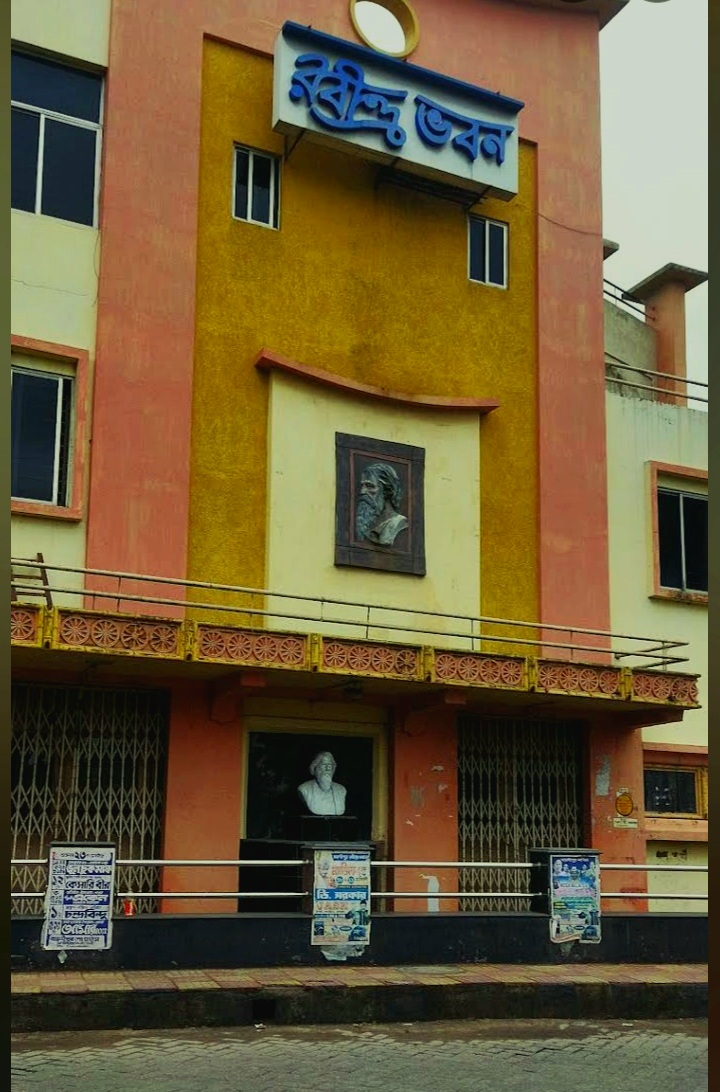
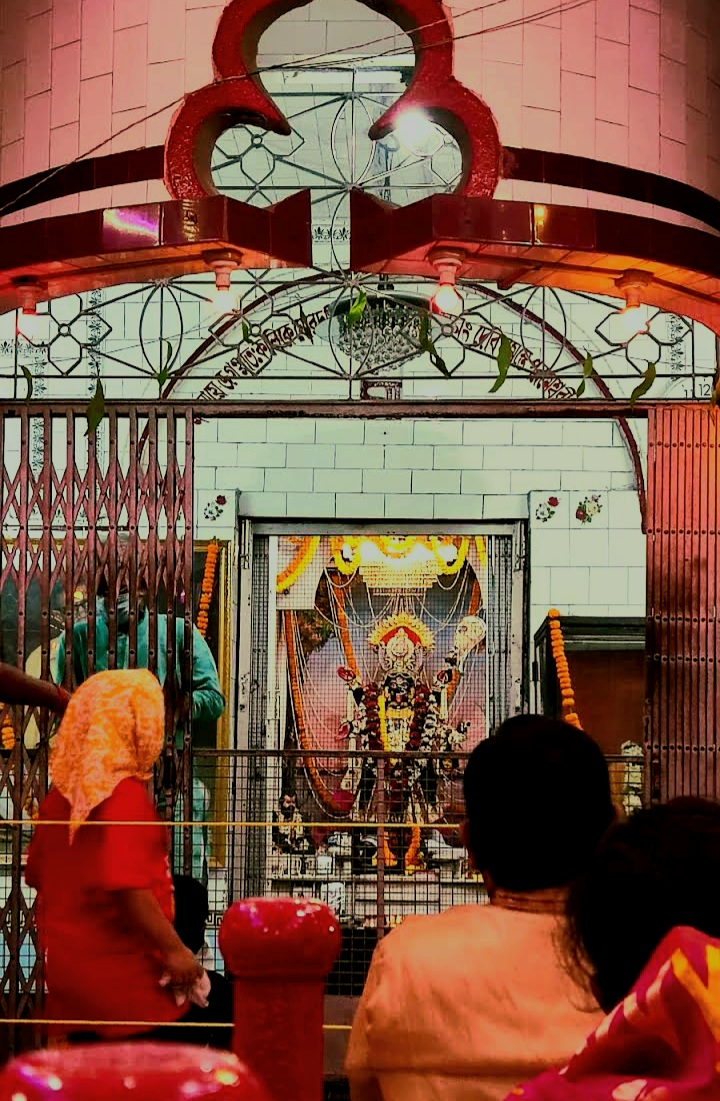
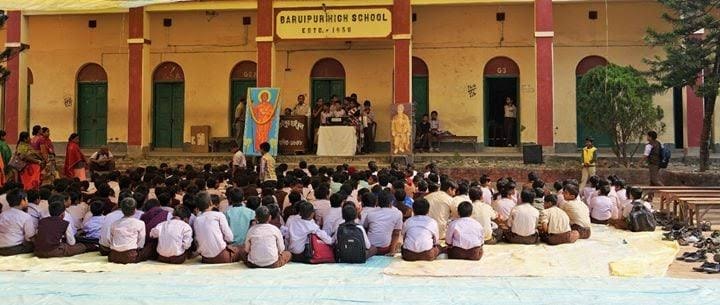
- clockwise from top: Baruipur Rajbari, Baruipur Mahaprabhutala, Shibanipeeth Maa Shibani Temple, Baruipur High School, Baruipur Rabindra Bhavan, Sadabrata Ghat
- Interactive map of Baruipur
- Location in West Bengal Location in India Location in Asia Location in Earth
- Coordinates: 22°21′38″N 88°25′56″E
- Country: India
- State: West Bengal
- Division: Presidency
- District: South 24 Parganas

Government
  - Type: Municipality
  - Body: Baruipur Municipality

Area
  - Total: 9.50 km^{2} (3.67 sq mi)
- Elevation: 11 m (36 ft)

Population (2011)
  - Total: 53,128
  - Density: 5,590/km^{2} (14,500/sq mi)

Demographics
  - Literacy: 92.04 per cent
  - Sex ratio: 988 ♂/♀

Languages
  - Official: Bengali
  - Additional official: English
- Time zone: UTC+5:30 (IST)
- PIN: 700144, 700145
- Telephone code: +91 33
- Vehicle registration: WB-19, WB-20, WB-95, WB-96, WB-97, WB-98
- Lok Sabha constituency: Jadavpur
- Vidhan Sabha constituency: Baruipur Purba, Baruipur Paschim
- Website: www.baruipurmunicipality.org.in

Baruipur (Bengali: [bɑːɾuɪpuɾ]) is a city and a municipality of South 24 Parganas district in the Indian state of West Bengal. It is the headquarters of Baruipur subdivision and is a part of the area covered by Kolkata Metropolitan Development Authority (KMDA).

== History ==
Many janapadas grew up along the old Bhagirathi channel from the ancient times until around the 16th century: Kalighat, Boral, Rajpur, Harinavi, Mahinagar, Baruipur, Baharu, Jaynagar, Majilpur, Chhatrabhog etc. Bipradas Pipilai's Manasavijaya, composed in 1495, mentions many places in this region. Chand Sadagar, a merchant character of the Manasavijaya, reached Baruipur, from Kalighat, through the old Bhagirathi channel. From there he proceeded towards Chhatrabhog, and then travelling through Hatiagarh pargana reached the open sea. Chaitanyadeva (1486–1534) also went through this route. Travelling by boat to Puri he halted at the village of Atisara, near Baruipur. His last stoppage in 24 Parganas was at Chhatrabhog. Chhatrabhog seems to have been an important river-port on the old Bhagirathi channel. Rama Chandra Khan, the zamindar of Chhatrabhog, helped Chaitanyadeva to continue with his journey.

== Geography ==
Cities and towns in the southern part of Baruipur subdivision (including Baruipur, Jaynagar I & II, Kultali CD blocks) in South 24 Parganas district
M: municipal city/ town, CT: census town, R: rural/ urban centre, N: neighbourhood, H: historical place/ religious centre
Places linked with coastal activity are marked in blue
Owing to space constraints in the small map, the actual locations in a larger map may vary slightly

=== Area overview ===
Baruipur subdivision is a rural subdivision with moderate levels of urbanization. 31.05% of the population lives in the urban areas and 68.95% lives in the rural areas. In the southern portion of the subdivision (shown in the map alongside) there are 20 census towns. The entire district is situated in the Ganges Delta and the southern part is covered by the Baruipur-Jaynagar Plain. Archaeological excavations at Dhosa and Tilpi, on the bank of the Piyali River indicate the existence of human habitation around 2,000 years ago.

Note: The map alongside presents some of the notable locations in the subdivision. All places marked in the map are linked in the larger full screen map.

=== Location ===
Baruipur is located at 22°21′38″N 88°25′56″E. It has an average elevation of 11 metres (36 ft).

Khodar Bazar on the west, Salipur on the north, Baruipur (P) on the east are census towns adjacent to Baruipur, and Komarhat is a little away on the south, as per the map of the Baruipur CD block in the District Census Handbook 2011 for the South 24 Parganas district.

=== Climate ===
Köppen-Geiger climate classification system classifies its climate as tropical wet and dry (Aw).

Climate data for Baruipur
Month	Jan	Feb	Mar	Apr	May	Jun	Jul	Aug	Sep	Oct	Nov	Dec	Year
Mean daily maximum °C (°F)	25.4 (77.7)	27.7 (81.9)	31.4 (88.5)	33.1 (91.6)	33.4 (92.1)	32.3 (90.1)	30.7 (87.3)	30.8 (87.4)	31.2 (88.2)	30.8 (87.4)	28.1 (82.6)	25.1 (77.2)	30.0 (86.0)
Daily mean °C (°F)	19.9 (67.8)	22.7 (72.9)	27 (81)	29.3 (84.7)	30 (86)	29.5 (85.1)	28.5 (83.3)	28.6 (83.5)	28.5 (83.3)	27.5 (81.5)	23.5 (74.3)	20 (68)	26.3 (79.3)
Mean daily minimum °C (°F)	14.5 (58.1)	17.7 (63.9)	22.6 (72.7)	25.6 (78.1)	26.7 (80.1)	26.8 (80.2)	26.4 (79.5)	26.4 (79.5)	25.9 (78.6)	24.2 (75.6)	19 (66)	14.6 (58.3)	22.5 (72.6)
Average precipitation mm (inches)	14 (0.6)	17 (0.7)	20 (0.8)	34 (1.3)	96 (3.8)	244 (9.6)	323 (12.7)	322 (12.7)	321 (12.6)	172 (6.8)	30 (1.2)	1 (0.0)	1,594 (62.8)
Source: Climate-Data.org (altitude: 11 m)

== Demographics ==
=== Population ===
Historical population
Year	Pop.	±%
1901	4,217	—
1911	6,375	+51.2%
1921	5,114	−19.8%
1931	6,483	+26.8%
1941	7,130	+10.0%
1951	9,238	+29.6%
1961	13,608	+47.3%
1971	20,501	+50.7%
1981	26,229	+27.9%
1991	37,659	+43.6%
2001	44,913	+19.3%
2011	53,128	+18.3%
Source: Census of India

According to the 2011 Census of India, Baruipur had a total population of 53,128, of which 26,718 (50.29%) were males and 26,410 (49.71%) were females. It had a population density of 5,592 inhabitants per square kilometre (14,480/sq mi) with a sex ratio of 988 females for every 1000 males. There were 3,763 persons in the age range of 0 to 6 years which is 7.08% of the total population. The Scheduled Castes numbered 13,157 (24.76%) and the Scheduled Tribes numbered 317 (0.60%). The total number of literate persons was 45,434 (92.04% of the population over 6 years) out of which males numbered 23,405 (94.43% of the male population over 6 years) and females numbered 22,029 (89.62% of the female population over 6 years). Baruipur had a total of 13,226 households as per report released by 2011 Census of India.

=== Language ===
Languages of Baruipur (2011)
1. Bengali (95.5%)
2. Hindi (3.50%)
3. Urdu (0.94%)
4. Others (0.01%)

At the time of the 2011 Census of India, 95.55% of the population spoke Bengali, 3.50% Hindi and 0.94% Urdu as their first language.

=== Religion ===
Religion in Baruipur (2011)
Religion	Percent
Hinduism	89.25%
Islam	8.81%
Christianity	1.43%
Sikhism	0.05%
Buddhism	0.02%
Jainism	0.01%
Others or not stated	0.42%

According to the 2011 Census of India, 89.25% of the population is Hindu, 8.81% Muslim, 1.43% Christian, 0.05% Sikh, 0.02% Buddhist and 0.01% Jain. 0.42% did not state a religion in the census.

== Civic administration ==
=== Municipality ===
Baruipur Municipality covers an area of 9.50 km^{2} (3.67 sq mi). It has jurisdiction over the entire city of Baruipur. The municipality was established in 1869; 157 years ago. It is divided into 17 administrative wards. According to the 2022 municipal election, it is being controlled by the All India Trinamool Congress.

=== Police stations ===
Baruipur police station covers an area of 212.48 km^{2} (82.04 sq mi). It has jurisdiction over parts of the Baruipur Municipality, and the Baruipur CD block.

Baruipur women police station has jurisdiction over parts of the Baruipur Municipality, and the Baruipur CD block.

=== CD block HQ ===
The headquarters of the Baruipur CD block are located at Piyali Town. The map of the CD block Baruipur on the page number 383 in the District Census Handbook 2011 for the South 24 Parganas district shows the headquarters of the CD block as being in Baruipur.

== Transport ==
Baruipur is on the State Highway 1.

Baruipur Junction railway station is on the Sealdah–Namkhana line and Sealdah-Diamond Harbour line of the Kolkata Suburban Railway.

=== Commuters ===
With the electrification of the railways, suburban traffic has grown tremendously since the 1960s. As of 2005–06, more than 1.7 million (17 lakhs) commuters use the Kolkata Suburban Railway system daily. After the partition of India, refugees from erstwhile East Pakistan and Bangladesh had a strong impact on the development of urban areas in the periphery of Kolkata. The new immigrants depended on Kolkata for their livelihood, thus increasing the number of commuters. Eastern Railway runs 1,272 EMU trains daily.

== Education ==
- Baruipur High School is a Bengali-medium school for boys. It was established in 1858 and has facilities for teaching from class V to class XII.
- Greater Kolkata College of Engineering and Management, established in 2008, offers diploma, undergraduate and postgraduate degree courses in Engineering and Technology and other allied fields.

== Healthcare ==
Baruipur Subdivisional Hospital, with 250 beds, is the major government medical facility in the Baruipur subdivision.

== Notable people ==
- Bankim Chandra Chatterjee, novelist, poet, essayist, journalist and magistrate
- Subhankar Chattopadhyay, director, script writer and non-fiction show creator
- Salil Chowdhury, music director, lyricist, writer and poet
- Linus Nirmal Gomes, bishop
- Madhumita Sarcar, actress
