= Harinbari =

- Village
- Location in West Bengal Location in India
- Coordinates: 21.7488°N 88.0983°E
- Country: India
- State: West Bengal
- District: South 24 Parganas
- CD Block: Sagar

Area
  - Total: 5.50 km^{2} (2.12 sq mi)
- Elevation: 4 m (13 ft)

Population (2011)
  - Total: 5,455
  - Density: 992/km^{2} (2,570/sq mi)

Languages
  - Official: Bengali
  - Additional official: English
- Time zone: UTC+5:30 (IST)
- PIN: 743373
- Telephone code: +91 3210
- Vehicle registration: WB-19 to WB-22, WB-95 to WB-99
- Lok Sabha constituency: Mathurapur (SC)
- Vidhan Sabha constituency: Sagar
- Website: www.s24pgs.gov.in

Harinbari is a village within the jurisdiction of the Sagar police station in the Sagar CD block in the Kakdwip subdivision of the South 24 Parganas district in the Indian state of West Bengal.

== Geography ==
Places in Kakdwip subdivision (Kakdwip, Sagar, Namkhana, Patharpratima CD blocks) in South 24 Parganas district
R: rural/ urban centre
Places linked with coastal activity are marked in blue
Owing to space constraints in the small map, the actual locations in a larger map may vary slightly

=== Area overview ===
Kakdwip subdivision has full rural population. The entire district is situated in the Ganges Delta. The southern part of the delta has numerous channels and islands such as the Henry Island, Sagar Island, Frederick Island and Fraserganj Island. The subdivision is a part of the Sundarbans settlements. A comparatively recent country-wide development is the guarding of the coastal areas by special coastal forces. The area attracts large number of tourists – Gangasagar and Fraserganj-Bakkhali are worth mentioning. Gobardhanpur holds a promise for the future.

Note: The map alongside presents some of the notable locations in the subdivision. All places marked in the map are linked in the larger full screen map.

=== Location ===
Harinbari is located at 21.7488°N 88.0983°E.

== Demographics ==
According to the 2011 Census of India, Harinbari had a total population of 5,455, of which 2,847 (52%) were males and 2,608 (48%) were females. There were 588 persons in the age range of 0 to 6 years. The total number of literate persons in Harinbari was 7,437 (87.55% of the population over 6 years).

== Transport ==
Rudranagar to Jibantala Road links Harinbari to Kachuberia, where a ferry is available across the Muri Ganga River to Harwood Point on the main land.

== Education ==
Sagar Mahavidyalaya, established in 1998, is affiliated with the University of Calcutta. It offers honours courses in English and Bengali and general courses in arts and science.

== Healthcare ==
Sagar Rural Hospital at Rudranagar, with 30 beds, is the major government medical facility in the Sagar CD block.
