= Sagar (community development block) =

Community Development Block in West Bengal, India

- Community Development Block
- Location of Sagar community development block in South 24 Parganas district
- Coordinates: 21.6528°N 88.0753°E
- Country: India
- State: West Bengal
- Division: Presidency
- District: South 24 Parganas
- Subdivision: Kakdwip
- Headquarters: Rudranagar

Government
  - Gram Panchayats: Dhablat, Dhaspara Sumatinagar-I, Dhaspara Sumatinagar-II, Gangasagar, Ghoramara, Muriganga-I, Muriganga-II, Ramkarchar, Rudranagar
  - Lok Sabha constituencies: Mathurapur
  - Vidhan Sabha constituencies: Sagar

Area
  - Total: 282.11 km^{2} (108.92 sq mi)

Population (2011)
  - Total: 212,037
  - Density: 751.61/km^{2} (1,946.7/sq mi)

Demographics
  - Literacy: 84.21 per cent
  - Sex ratio: 937 ♂/♀

Languages
  - Official: Bengali
  - Additional official: English
- Time zone: UTC+05:30 (IST)
- Website: s24pgs.gov.in

Sagar is a community development block that forms an administrative division in Kakdwip subdivision of South 24 Parganas district in the Indian state of West Bengal.

== History ==
=== Tebhaga movement ===
During the Bengal Famine of 1943, the Communist Party of India provided relief to the peasantry of the Sundarbans area. In September 1946 Bangiya Pradeshik Kisan Sabha decided to launch the Tebhaga movement. The peasant movement broke out in Kakdwip, Sonarpur, Bhangar and Canning. Kakdwip and Namkhana were the storm centres of the movement. The movement aimed at improving the share of the peasant engaged as sharecroppers. The prominent leaders of the movement were: Kansari Halder, Ashoke Bose and Rash Behari Ghosh. Peasant leaders like Gajen Malik, Manik Hazra, Jatin Maity, Bijoy Mondal and others rose to prominence. The movement continued till 1950, when the Bargadari Act was enacted. The Act recognised the right of the sharecropper to two-thirds of the produce when he provided the inputs.

=== Land reforms ===
During 1946-1950, the Tebhaga movement in several parts of the 24 Parganas district led to the enactment of the Bargadari Act. Although the Bargadari Act of 1950 recognised the rights of bargadars to a higher share of crops from the land that they tilled, it was not implemented. Large tracts, beyond the prescribed limit of land ceiling, remained with the rich landlords. In 1967, West Bengal witnessed a peasant uprising, against non-implementation of land reforms legislation, starting from Kheadaha gram panchayat in Sonarpur CD block. From 1977 on wards major land reforms took place in West Bengal under the Left Front government. Land in excess of land ceiling was acquired and distributed among the peasants. Subsequently, Operation Barga was aimed at securing tenancy rights for the peasants. In Sagar CD block 7,926.42 acres of land was acquired and vested. Out of this 5,680.89 acres or 71.67% of the vested land was distributed among the peasants. The total number of patta (document) holders was 13,350.

== Geography ==

Sagar CD block is located at 21°39′10″N 88°04′31″E. It has an average elevation of 4 metres (13 ft).

Sagar CD block is bounded by Kakdwip CD block, across the Muri Ganga, in the north, Namkhana CD block, across the Muri Ganga, in the east, Bay of Bengal in the south and Khejuri II CD block in Purba Medinipur district, across the Hooghly, in the west.

South 24 Parganas district is divided into two distinct physiographic zones: the marine-riverine delta in the north and the marine delta zone in the south. As the sea receded southwards, in the sub-recent geological period, a large low-lying plain got exposed. Both tidal inflows and the rivers have been depositing sediments in this plain. The periodical collapse of both the natural levees and man-made embankments speed up the process of filling up of the depressions containing brackish water wetlands. The marine delta in the south is formed of interlacing tidal channels. As non-saline water for irrigation is scarce, agriculture is monsoon dominated. Some parts of the wetlands are still preserved for raising fish.

Sagar CD block has an area of 282.11 km^{2}. It has 1 panchayat samity, 9 gram panchayats, 147 gram sansads (village councils), 47 mouzas and 42 inhabited villages, as per District Statistical Handbook South Twenty-four Parganas. Sagar and Gangasagar Coastal police stations serve this CD Block. Headquarters of this CD block is at Rudranagar.

Sagar CD block has 85 km of embankments. Breaches in these embankments ranged between 6 and 7 km annually. Embankments raised along rivers are of critical importance for the safety of lives and protection of crops, against daily tides and tidal surges.

Gram panchayats of Sagar CD block/panchayat samiti are: Dhablat, Dhaspara Sumatinagar-I, Dhaspara Sumatinagar-II, Gangasagar, Ghoramara, Muriganga-I, Muriganga-II, Ramkarchar and Rudranagar.

== Demographics ==
=== Population ===
As per the 2011 Census of India, Sagar CD block had a total population of 212,037, all of which were rural. There were 109,468 (52%) males and 102,569 (48%) females. Population below 6 years was 26,212. Scheduled Castes numbered 56,261 (26.53%) and Scheduled Tribes numbered 854 (0.40%).

As per the 2001 Census of India, Sagar CD block had a total population of 206,890, out of which 95,572 were males and 90,058 were females. Sagar CD block registered a population growth of 20.38 per cent during the 2001-2011 decade. Decadal growth for South 24 Parganas district was 20.89 per cent. Decadal growth in West Bengal was 17.84 per cent. Scheduled Castes at 52,597 formed around one-fourth the population. Scheduled Tribes numbered 1,743.

Large villages (with 4,000+ population) in Sagar CD block (2011 census figures in brackets): Ghoramara (5,193), Sapkhali (6,738), Kachubaria (7,727), Companir Char (5,262), Dhaspara (5,525), Bamankhali (4,151), Mandirtala (6,135), Phuldubi (5,731), Mahendraganj (4,559), Narendraganj (4,556), Haradhanpur (8,998), Sumatinagara (4,699), Manasadwip (2nd portion) (6,206), Kamalpur (6,602), Rudranagar (7,132), Khan Saheber Abad (6,082), Khas Ramkarer Char (7,556), Krishnanagar (8,105), Harinbari (5,455), Radha Krishnapur (5,082), Bishnupur (6,349), Beguakhali (5,683), Gangasagar (10,340), Purusattompur (6,753), Chemagari (6,564), Sibpur (9,344) and Dhablat (6,778).

=== Literacy ===
As per the 2011 census, the total number of literates in Sagar CD block was 156,476 (84.21% of the population over 6 years) out of which males numbered 87,052 (90.56% of the male population over 6 years) and females numbered 69,424 (77.39% of the female population over 6 years). The gender disparity (the difference between female and male literacy rates) was 13.17%.

As per the 2011 Census of India, literacy in South 24 Parganas district was 77.51 Literacy in West Bengal was 77.08% in 2011. Literacy in India in 2011 was 74.04%.

As per the 2001 Census of India, Sagar CD block had a total literacy of 77.87 per cent for the 6+ age group. While male literacy was 87.96 per cent female literacy was 67.12 per cent. South 24 Parganas district had a total literacy of 69.45 per cent, male literacy being 79.19 per cent and female literacy being 59.01 per cent.

See also – List of West Bengal districts ranked by literacy rate

Literacy in CD blocks of
South 24 Parganas district
Alipore Sadar subdivision
Bishnupur I – 78.33%
Bishnupur II – 81.37%
Budge Budge I – 80.57%
Budge Budge II – 79.13%
Thakurpukur Maheshtala – 83.54%
Baruipur subdivision
Baruipur – 76.46%
Bhangar I – 72.06%
Bhangar II – 74.49%
Jaynagar I – 73.17%
Jaynagar II – 69.71%
Kultali – 69.37%
Sonarpur – 79.70%
Canning subdivision
Basanti – 68.32%
Canning I – 70.76%
Canning II – 66.51%
Gosaba – 78.98%
Diamond Harbour subdivision
Diamond Harbour I – 75.72%
Diamond Harbour II – 76.91%
Falta – 77.17%
Kulpi – 75.49%
Magrahat I – 73.82%
Magrahat II – 77.41%
Mandirbazar – 75.89%
Mathurapur I – 73.93%
Mathurapur II – 77.77%
Kakdwip subdivision
Kakdwip – 77.93%
Namkhana – 85.72
Patharpratima – 82.11%
Sagar – 84.21%
Source: 2011 Census: CD Block Wise
Primary Census Abstract Data

=== Language ===
Languages of Sagar CD block (2011)
1. Bengali (99.7%)
2. Hindi (0.23%)
3. Urdu (0.02%)
4. Others (0.01%)

At the time of the 2011 census, 99.74% of the population spoke Bengali, 0.23% Hindi and 0.02% Urdu as their first language.

=== Religion ===
Religion in Sagar CD block (2011)
Hinduism	87.88%
Islam	11.73%
Other or not stated	0.39%

In the 2011 Census of India, Hindus numbered 186,346 and formed 87.88% of the population in Sagar CD block. Muslims numbered 24,879 and formed 11.73% of the population. Others numbered 812 and formed 0.39% of the population. In 2001, Hindus and Muslims made up 88.96% and 10.91% of the population respectively.

The proportion of Hindus in South Twenty-four Parganas district has declined from 76.0% in 1961 to 63.2% in 2011. The proportion of Muslims in South Twenty-four Parganas district has increased from 23.4% to 35.6% during the same period. Christians formed 0.8% in 2011.

== Rural poverty ==
As per the Human Development Report for South 24 Parganas district, published in 2009, in Sagar CD block the percentage of households below poverty line was 44.46%. The poverty rates were very high in the Sundarbans settlements with all thirteen CD blocks registering poverty ratios above 30% and eight CD blocks had more than 40% of the population in the BPL category. The Sundarban region remains the most backward region in terms of quality of life. As per rural household survey in 2005, the proportion of households in South 24 Parganas with poverty rates below poverty line was 34.11%, way above the state and national poverty ratios.

== Economy ==
=== Livelihood ===
Livelihood
in Sagar CD block
1. Cultivators (24.5%)
2. Agricultural labourers (43.7%)
3. Household industries (4.18%)
4. Other Workers (27.6%)

In Sagar CD block in 2011, among the class of total workers, cultivators numbered 20,766 and formed 24.46%, agricultural labourers numbered 37,110 and formed 43.72%, household industry workers numbered 3,550 and formed 4.18% and other workers numbered 25,455 and formed 27.63%. Total workers numbered 84,881 and formed 40.03% of the total population, and non-workers numbered 127,156 and formed 59.97% of the population.

The District Human Development Report points out that in the blocks of region situated in the close proximity of the Kolkata metropolis, overwhelming majority are involved in the non-agricultural sector for their livelihood. On the other hand, in the Sundarban region, overwhelming majority are dependent on agriculture. In the intermediate region, there is again predominance of the non-agricultural sector. Though the region is not very close to Kolkata, many places are well connected and some industrial/ economic development has taken place.

Note: In the census records a person is considered a cultivator, if the person is engaged in cultivation/ supervision of land owned by self/government/institution. When a person who works on another person's land for wages in cash or kind or share, is regarded as an agricultural labourer. Household industry is defined as an industry conducted by one or more members of the family within the household or village, and one that does not qualify for registration as a factory under the Factories Act. Other workers are persons engaged in some economic activity other than cultivators, agricultural labourers and household workers. It includes factory, mining, plantation, transport and office workers, those engaged in business and commerce, teachers, entertainment artistes and so on.

=== Infrastructure ===
There are 42 inhabited villages in Sagar CD block, as per the District Census Handbook, South Twenty-four Parganas, 2011. 100% villages have power supply. 39 villages (92.86%) have drinking water supply. 31 villages (73.81%) have post offices. 36 villages (85.71%) have telephones (including landlines, public call offices and mobile phones). 12 villages (28.57%) have pucca (paved) approach roads and 22 villages (52.38%) have transport communication (includes bus service, rail facility and navigable waterways). 7 villages (16.67%) have agricultural credit societies and 7 villages (16.67%) have banks.

=== Agriculture ===
According to the District Human Development Report, agriculture is an important source of livelihood in South Twentyfour Parganas district. The amount of cultivable land per agricultural worker is only 0.41 hectare in the district. Moreover, the irrigation facilities have not been extended to a satisfactory scale. Agriculture mostly remains a mono-cropped activity.

As per the District Census Handbook, the saline soil of the district is unfit for cultivation, but the non-salty lands are very fertile. While rice is the main food crop, jute is the main cash crop.

In 2013-14, there were 170 fertiliser depots, 23 seed stores and 33 fair price shops in Sagar CD block.

In 2013–14, Sagar CD block produced 80,605 tonnes of Aman paddy, the main winter crop, from 29,616 hectares, 614 tonnes of Boro paddy (spring crop) from 199 hectares, 1,365 tonnes of potatoes from 42 hectares. It also produced pulses and oilseeds.

=== Pisciculture ===
In Sagar CD block, in 2013-14, net area under effective pisciculture was 3,106 hectares, engaging 5,977 persons in the profession, and with an approximate annual production of 73,856 quintals.

Pisciculture is an important source of employment in South 24 Parganas district. As of 2001, more than 4.5 lakh people were engaged in Pisciculture. Out of this 2.57 lakhs were from the 13 blocks in the Sundarbans.

=== Banking ===
In 2013-14, Sagar CD block had offices of 3 commercial banks and 3 gramin banks.

=== Backward Regions Grant Fund ===
South 24 Parganas district is listed as a backward region and receives financial support from the Backward Regions Grant Fund. The fund, created by the Government of India, is designed to redress regional imbalances in development. As of 2012, 272 districts across the country were listed under this scheme. The list includes 11 districts of West Bengal.

== Transport ==
Sagar CD block has 4 ferry services and 1 originating/ terminating bus route. The nearest railway station is 30 km from the block headquarters.

== Education ==
In 2013-14, Sagar had 125 primary schools with 12,138 students, 8 middle schools with 626 students, 15 high schools with 6,032 students and 16 higher secondary schools with 11,369 students. Sagar CD block had 1 general degree college with 1,700 students, 433 institutions for special and non-formal education with 15,353 students.

See also – Education in India

As per the 2011 census, in Sagar CD block, amongst the 42 inhabited villages, all villages had schools, 37 villages had two or more primary schools, 32 villages had at least 1 primary and 1 middle school and 25 villages had at least 1 middle and 1 secondary school.

Sagar Mahavidyalaya was established at Harinbari in 1998.

== Healthcare ==
In 2014, Sagar CD block had 1 rural hospital, 3 primary health centres and 1 NGO/ private nursing home with total 83 beds and 10 doctors (excluding private bodies). It had 42 family welfare subcentres. 6,619 patients were treated indoor and 99,162 patients were treated outdoor in the hospitals, health centres and subcentres of the CD block.

As per 2011 census, in Sagar CD block, 2 villages had community health centres, 4 villages had primary health centres, 33 villages had primary health subcentres, 2 villages had maternity and child welfare centres, 2 villages had veterinary hospitals, 9 villages had medicine shops and out of the 42 inhabited villages 4 villages had no medical facilities.

Sagar Rural Hospital at Rudranagar, with 30 beds, is the major government medical facility in the Sagar CD block. There are primary health centres at Gangasagar (with 6 beds), Mahendraganj (with 6 beds) and Muriganga (with 6 beds).
