= Ganespur =

- Village
- Location in West Bengal Location in India
- Coordinates: 21.8918°N 88.2113°E
- Country: India
- State: West Bengal
- District: South 24 Parganas
- CD Block: Kakdwip

Area
  - Total: 16.01 km^{2} (6.18 sq mi)
- Elevation: 4 m (13 ft)

Population (2011)
  - Total: 32,932
  - Density: 2,057/km^{2} (5,328/sq mi)

Languages
  - Official: Bengali
  - Additional official: English
- Time zone: UTC+5:30 (IST)
- PIN: 743347
- Telephone code: +91 3210
- Vehicle registration: WB-19 to WB-22, WB-95 to WB-99
- Lok Sabha constituency: Mathurapur (SC)
- Vidhan Sabha constituency: Kakdwip
- Website: www.s24pgs.gov.in

Ganespur is a village within the jurisdiction of the Kakdwip police station in the Kakdwip CD block in the Kakdwip subdivision of the South 24 Parganas district in the Indian state of West Bengal.

== Geography ==
Places in Kakdwip subdivision (Kakdwip, Sagar, Namkhana, Patharpratima CD blocks) in South 24 Parganas district
R: rural/ urban centre
Places linked with coastal activity are marked in blue
Owing to space constraints in the small map, the actual locations in a larger map may vary slightly

=== Area overview ===
Kakdwip subdivision has full rural population. The entire district is situated in the Ganges Delta. The southern part of the delta has numerous channels and islands such as Henry Island, Sagar Island, Frederick Island and Fraserganj Island. The subdivision is a part of the Sundarbans settlements. A comparatively recent country-wide development is the guarding of the coastal areas by special coastal forces. The area attracts large number of tourists – Gangasagar and Fraserganj-Bakkhali are worth mentioning. Gobardhanpur holds a promise for the future.

Note: The map alongside presents some of the notable locations in the subdivision. All places marked in the map are linked in the larger full screen map.

=== Location ===
Ganespur is located at 21.8918°N 88.2113°E.

== Demographics ==
According to the 2011 Census of India, Ganespur had a total population of 32,932, of which 16,841 (51%) were males and 16,091 (49%) were females. There were 3,651 persons in the age range of 0 to 6 years. The total number of literate persons in Ganespur was 24,963 (84.99% of the population over 6 years).

== Civic administration ==
=== CD block HQ ===
The map of CD block Kakdwip on page 837 in the District Census Handbook for South 24 Parganas shows the block headquarters as being located in Ganespur.

== Transport ==
Ganespur is on the National Highway 12.

Kakdwip railway station is located nearby.

== Healthcare ==
Harendranagar Block Primary Health Centre at Harendranagar, with 10 beds, is the major government medical facility in the Kakdwip CD block.
