= Fraserganj =

- Village
- Location in West Bengal Location in India
- Coordinates: 21.5851°N 88.2585°E
- Country: India
- State: West Bengal
- District: South 24 Parganas
- CD Block: Namkhana
- Elevation: 4 m (13 ft)

Languages
  - Official: Bengali
  - Additional official: English
- Time zone: UTC+5:30 (IST)
- PIN: 743357
- Telephone code: +91 3210
- Vehicle registration: WB-19 to WB-22, WB-95 to WB-99
- Lok Sabha constituency: Mathurapur (SC)
- Vidhan Sabha constituency: Sagar
- Website: www.s24pgs.gov.in

Fraserganj is a village and a gram panchayat within the jurisdiction of the Namkhana police station in the Namkhana CD block in the Kakdwip subdivision of the South 24 Parganas district in the Indian state of West Bengal.

== History ==
Sir Andrew Fraser, Lieutenant Governor of Bengal (1903–1908) in the early twentieth century, is credited with the "discovery" of the place. In recognition of his efforts, it was named Frasergunj. There is a dilapidated house near the beach, which according to the locals was the one in which Fraser used to stay.

== Geography ==
Places in Kakdwip subdivision (Kakdwip, Sagar, Namkhana, Patharpratima CD blocks) in South 24 Parganas district
R: rural/ urban centre
Places linked with coastal activity are marked in blue
Owing to space constraints in the small map, the actual locations in a larger map may vary slightly

=== Area overview ===
Kakdwip subdivision has full rural population. The entire district is situated in the Ganges Delta. The southern part of the delta has numerous channels and islands such as Henry Island, Sagar Island, Frederick Island and Fraserganj Island. The subdivision is a part of the Sundarbans settlements. A comparatively recent country-wide development is the guarding of the coastal areas by special coastal forces. The area attracts large number of tourists – Gangasagar and Fraserganj-Bakkhali are worth mentioning. Gobardhanpur holds a promise for the future.

Note: The map alongside presents some of the notable locations in the subdivision. All places marked in the map are linked in the larger full screen map.

=== Location ===
Fraserganj is located at 21.5851°N 88.2585°E.

== Civic administration ==
=== Police station ===
Frezerganj Coastal police station covers an area of 34.07 km^{2}. It has jurisdiction over parts of Namkhana CD block. The coastal police stations were formed with the objective of effective policing of the remote areas of the Sundarbans. The police has regular river patrols.

== Facilities ==
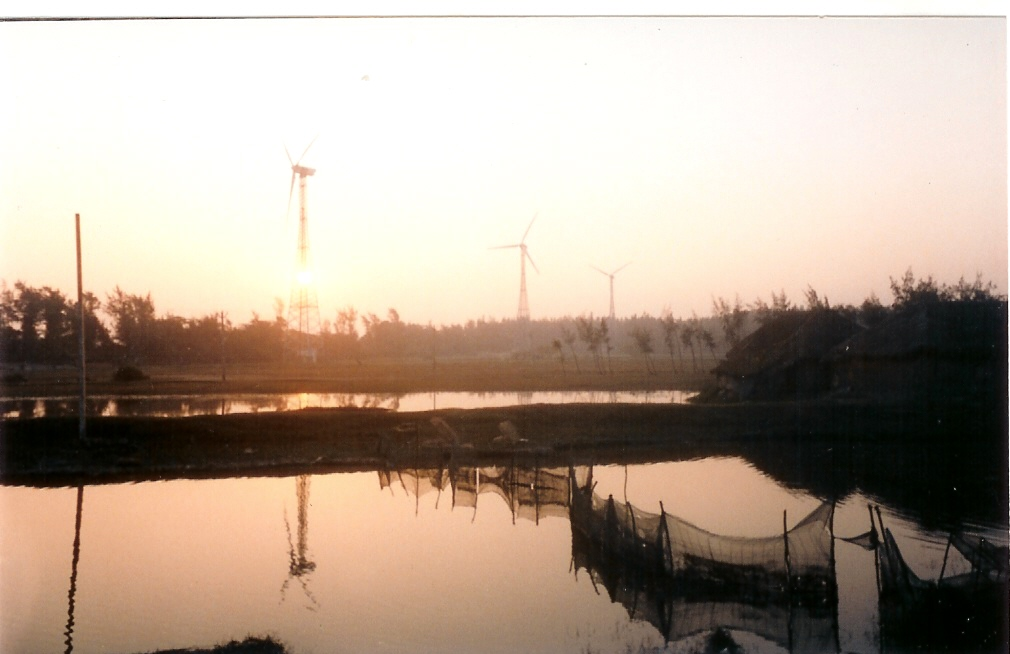
Windmills at Frasergunj

Fraserganj has a government operated fishing harbour and a wind energy farm that generates electricity.

Gently rolling waves play on the 8 km long beach from Bakkhali to Fraserganj, the twin places, now forming a continuous locality.

== Transport ==
Fraserganj is on the National Highway 12.

Namkhana railway station is located nearby.

== Healthcare ==
There is a primary health centre at Fraserganj, with 10 beds.
