= Narayanpur, Namkhana =

Narayanpur
- Village
- Location in West Bengal Location in India
- Coordinates: 21.7708°N 88.2510°E
- Country: India
- State: West Bengal
- District: South 24 Parganas
- CD Block: Namkhana

Area
  - Total: 6.87 km^{2} (2.65 sq mi)
- Elevation: 4 m (13 ft)

Population (2011)
  - Total: 12,201
  - Density: 1,780/km^{2} (4,600/sq mi)

Languages
  - Official: Bengali
  - Additional official: English
- Time zone: UTC+5:30 (IST)
- PIN: 743357
- Telephone code: +91 3210
- Vehicle registration: WB-19 to WB-22, WB-95 to WB-99
- Lok Sabha constituency: Mathurapur (SC)
- Vidhan Sabha constituency: Kakdwip
- Website: www.s24pgs.gov.in

Narayanpur is a village and a gram panchayat within the jurisdiction of the Namkhana police station in the Namkhana CD block in the Kakdwip subdivision of the South 24 Parganas district in the Indian state of West Bengal.

== Geography ==
Narayanpur is located at 21°46′15″N 88°15′04″E. It has an average elevation of 4 metres (13 ft).

== Demographics ==
As per 2011 Census of India, Narayanpur had a total population of 12,201.

== Transport ==
Narayanpur is on the National Highway 12.

Namkhana railway station is located nearby.

== Healthcare ==
There is a primary health centre at Narayanpur, with 6 beds.
