= Harwood Point =

- Village
- Location in West Bengal Location in India
- Coordinates: 21.8798°N 88.1663°E
- Country: India
- State: West Bengal
- District: South 24 Parganas
- CD Block: Kakdwip
- Elevation: 4 m (13 ft)

Languages
  - Official: Bengali
  - Additional official: English
- Time zone: UTC+5:30 (IST)
- PIN: 743347
- Telephone code: +91 3210
- Vehicle registration: WB-19 to WB-22, WB-95 to WB-99
- Lok Sabha constituency: Mathurapur (SC)
- Vidhan Sabha constituency: Kakdwip
- Website: www.s24pgs.gov.in

Harwood Point is a village within the jurisdiction of the Kakdwip police station in the Kakdwip CD block in the Kakdwip subdivision of the South 24 Parganas district in the Indian state of West Bengal.

== Geography ==
Places in Kakdwip subdivision (Kakdwip, Sagar, Namkhana, Patharpratima CD blocks) in South 24 Parganas district
R: rural/ urban centre
Places linked with coastal activity are marked in blue
Owing to space constraints in the small map, the actual locations in a larger map may vary slightly

=== Area overview ===
Kakdwip subdivision has full rural population. The entire district is situated in the Ganges Delta. The southern part of the delta has numerous channels and islands such as Henry Island, Sagar Island, Frederick Island and Fraserganj Island. The subdivision is a part of the Sundarbans settlements. A comparatively recent country-wide development is the guarding of the coastal areas by special coastal forces. The area attracts large number of tourists – Gangasagar and Fraserganj-Bakkhali are worth mentioning. Gobardhanpur holds a promise for the future.

Note: The map alongside presents some of the notable locations in the subdivision. All places marked in the map are linked in the larger full screen map.

=== Location ===
Harwood Point is located at 21.8798°N 88.1663°E.

Harwood Point Coastal police station is marked in Google maps. The area where Harwood Point is situated is marked as Kalinagar (Village No. 207) in the map of Kakdwip CD block on page 837 in theDistrict Census Handbook for the South 24 Parganas.

No. 8 Vessel Ghat has an hourly ferry service to Kachuberia in the Sagar Island, across the Muri Ganga River.

== Civic administration ==
=== Police station ===
Harwood Point Coastal police station covers an area of 169 km^{2}. It has jurisdiction over parts of the Kakdwip CD block. The coastal police stations were formed with the objective of effective policing of the remote areas of the Sundarbans. The police has regular river patrols.

== Fishing harbour ==
There is a minor fishing harbour, along with associated infrastructure, at Harwood Point. It was built to address the needs of fishermen who were using around 300 fishing trawlers and were unloading their catch along the coast in spite of lack of facilities earlier.

== Transport ==
Kachuberia-Udairampur Road links Harwood Point to the National Highway 12.

Kakdwip railway station is located nearby.

== Healthcare ==
Harendranagar Block Primary Health Centre at Harendranagar, with 10 beds, is the major government medical facility in the Kakdwip CD block.
