= Gangasagar =

- Village
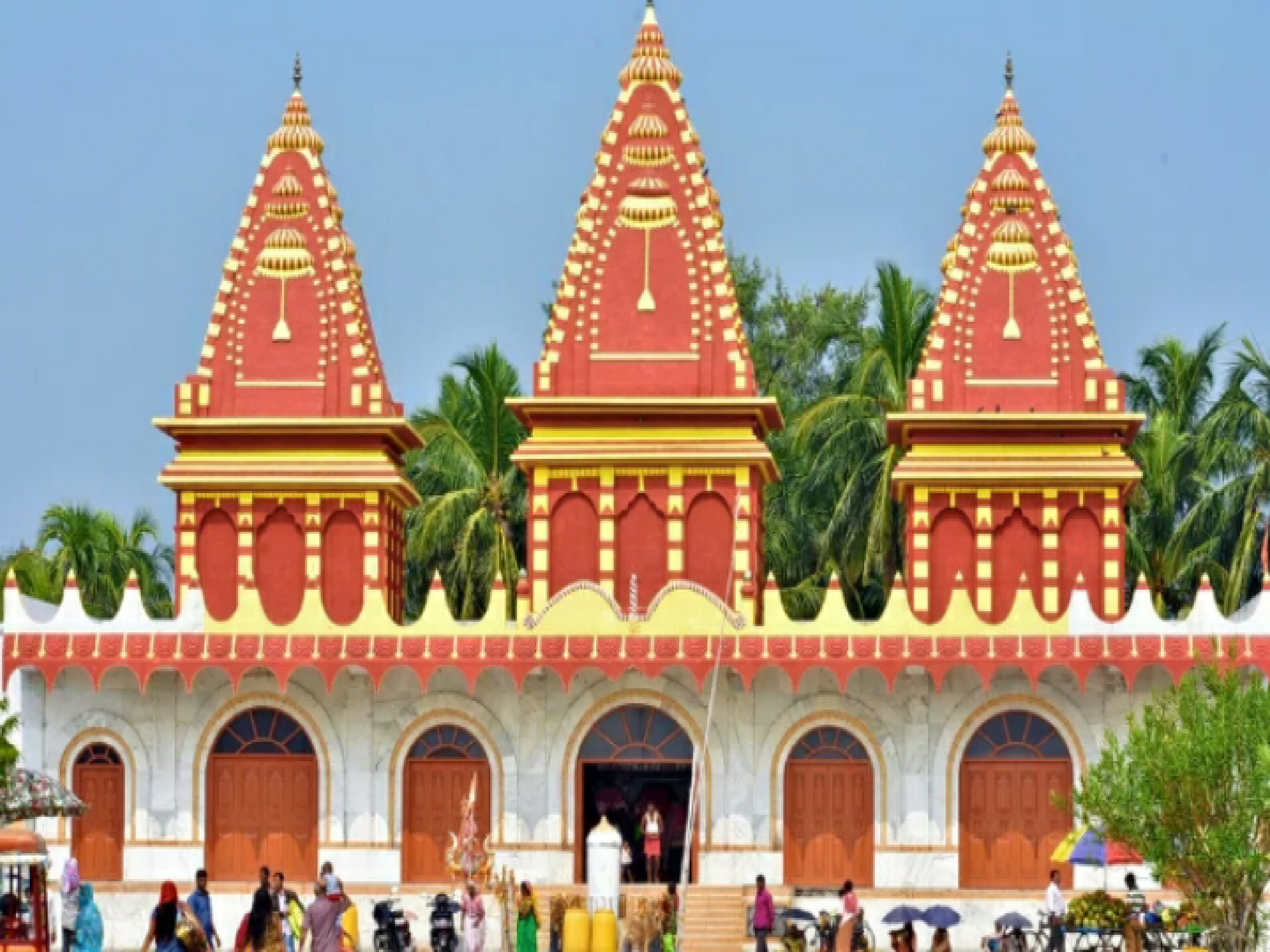
- Kapil Muni Ashram

- Location in West Bengal Location in India
- Coordinates: 21.6528°N 88.0753°E
- Country: India
- State: West Bengal
- District: South 24 Parganas
- CD Block: Sagar

Area
  - Total: 12.26 km^{2} (4.73 sq mi)
- Elevation: 4 m (13 ft)

Population (2011)
  - Total: 10,340
  - Density: 843.4/km^{2} (2,184/sq mi)

Languages
  - Official: Bengali
  - Additional official: English
- Time zone: UTC+5:30 (IST)
- PIN: 743373
- Telephone code: +91 3210
- Vehicle registration: WB-19 to WB-22, WB-95 to WB-99
- Lok Sabha constituency: Mathurapur (SC)
- Vidhan Sabha constituency: Sagar
- Website: www.s24pgs.gov.in www.gangasagartourism.co.in

Gangasagar/Gongasagar is a village and a gram panchayat in the Sagar CD block in the Kakdwip subdivision of the South 24 Parganas district in the Indian state of West Bengal.

== Legend ==
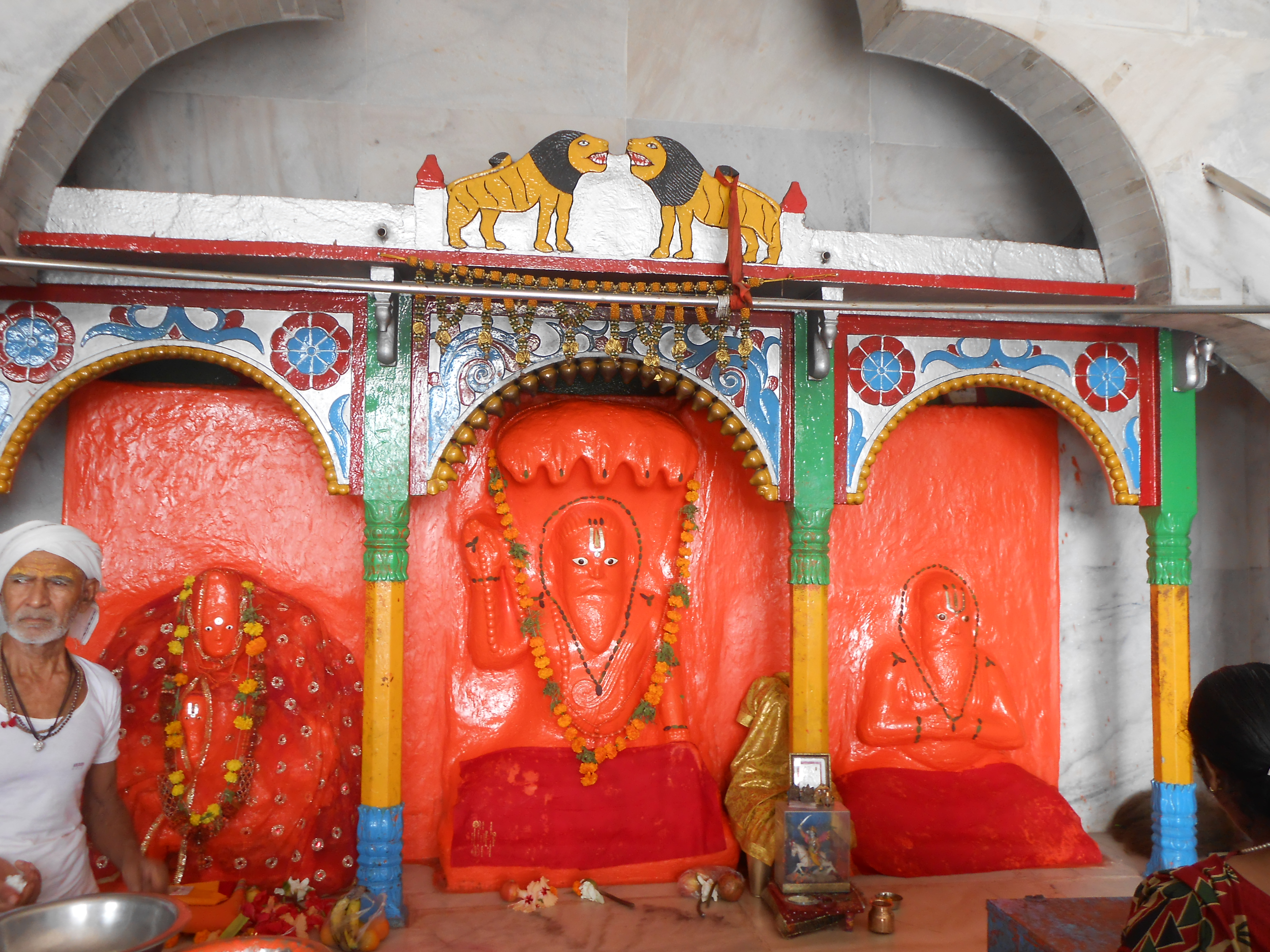
Kapila Ashram at Gangasagar

According to regional legend, Kardama made a pact with Vishnu, in which he agreed to undergo the rigours of marital life, on the condition that the deity would incarnate as his son. As agreed, Kapila was born to him as an incarnation of Vishnu, and became a great saint. Kapila's ashram is believed to have been located in this village. One day, King Sagara's sacrificial horse, which was necessary for the performance of his ashvamedha yajna ceremony, disappeared; it had been stolen by Indra.

The king sent his 60,000 sons to find the horse, and they found it next to Kapila's ashram, where Indra had hidden it. Mistaking Kapila for the thief, the sons accused the sage of the theft, who in his wrath at the false accusation burned the sons to ash and sent their souls to hell. Later, having compassion for the king's sons, Kapila acceded to the prayers of Sagara's descendants, agreeing to the restoration of the sons, if the goddess Ganga would descend upon the earth to perform the tarpana ritual of mixing the ashes with holy water (niravapanjali) for the sons of Sagara.

Through the performance of penance, King Bhagiratha induced Shiva to order Ganga down from heaven and the 60,000 sons were freed (moksha) and ascended to heaven, but the river Ganges stayed on earth. The date of the descent of Ganga is regarded to be the 15th day of January of the Gregorian Calendar, which coincides with the observance of Makara Sankranti. On this occasion, the sun god, Surya, is believed to enter the Makara Constellation (Uttarayana of the Hindu calendar).

== Geography ==
Places in Kakdwip subdivision (Kakdwip, Sagar, Namkhana, Patharpratima CD blocks) in South 24 Parganas district
R: rural/ urban centre
Places linked with coastal activity are marked in blue
Owing to space constraints in the small map, the actual locations in a larger map may vary slightly

=== Area overview ===
Kakdwip subdivision has full rural population. The entire district is situated in the Ganges Delta. The southern part of the delta has numerous channels and islands such as the Henry Island, Sagar Island, Frederick Island and Fraserganj Island. The subdivision is a part of the Sundarbans settlements. A comparatively recent country-wide development is the guarding of the coastal areas by special coastal forces. The area attracts large number of tourists – Gangasagar and Fraserganj-Bakkhali are worth mentioning. Gobardhanpur holds a promise for the future.

Note: The map alongside presents some of the notable locations in the subdivision. All places marked in the map are linked in the larger full screen map.

=== Location ===
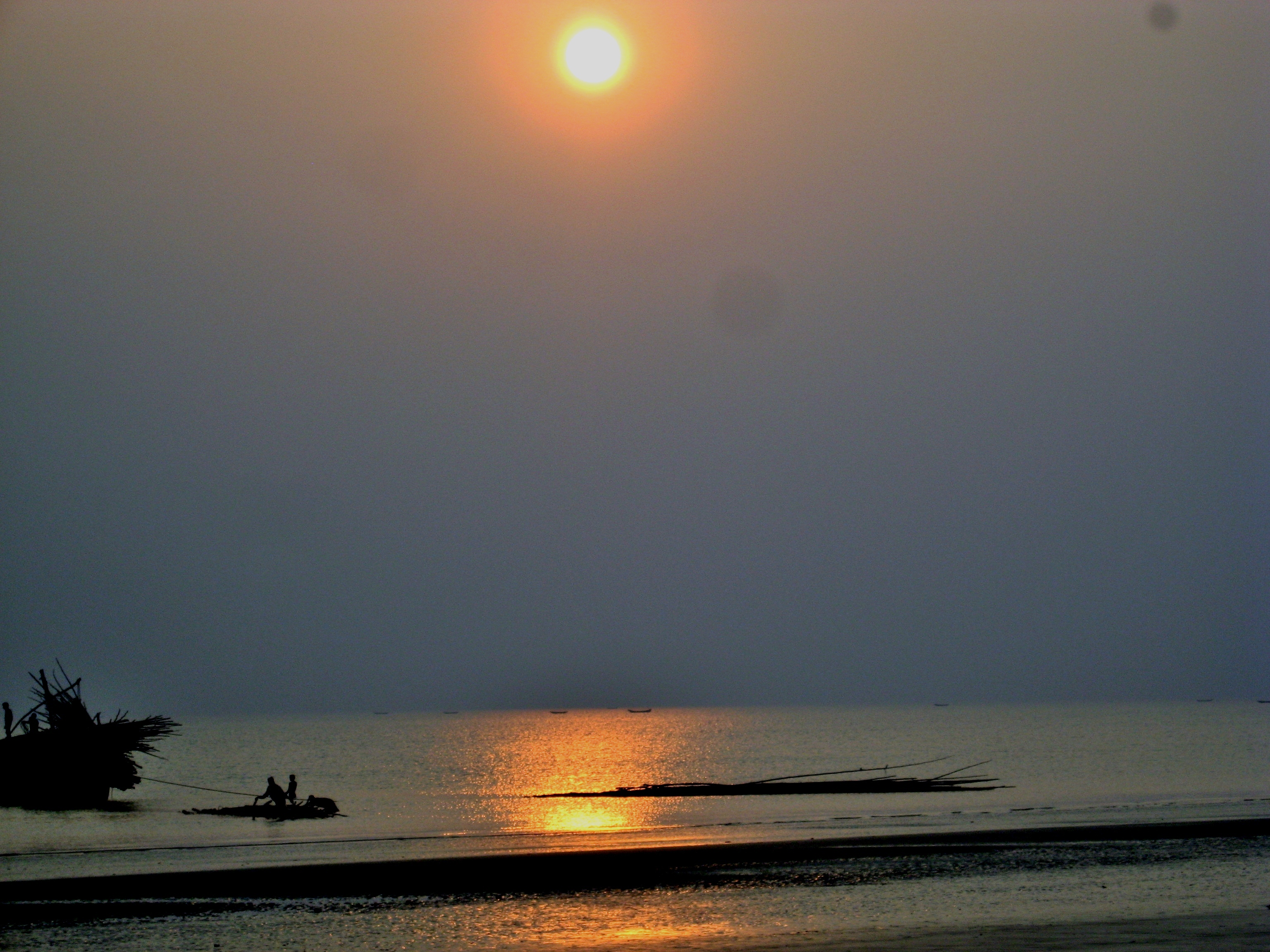
Sunset at Gangasagar

Gangasagar is located at 21°39′10″N 88°04′31″E. It has an average elevation of 4 metres (13 ft).

=== Climate ===
Climate data for Gangasagar (1981–2010, extremes 1865–2010)
Month	Jan	Feb	Mar	Apr	May	Jun	Jul	Aug	Sep	Oct	Nov	Dec	Year
Record high °C (°F)	30.6 (87.1)	33.9 (93.0)	38.3 (100.9)	39.4 (102.9)	38.7 (101.7)	40.0 (104.0)	36.1 (97.0)	36.7 (98.1)	36.1 (97.0)	34.0 (93.2)	32.9 (91.2)	32.9 (91.2)	40.0 (104.0)
Mean daily maximum °C (°F)	25.0 (77.0)	27.2 (81.0)	30.0 (86.0)	31.6 (88.9)	32.5 (90.5)	31.8 (89.2)	30.8 (87.4)	30.9 (87.6)	31.1 (88.0)	31.0 (87.8)	29.0 (84.2)	25.9 (78.6)	29.7 (85.5)
Mean daily minimum °C (°F)	16.0 (60.8)	19.8 (67.6)	23.9 (75.0)	25.9 (78.6)	26.7 (80.1)	27.1 (80.8)	26.8 (80.2)	26.5 (79.7)	26.4 (79.5)	24.9 (76.8)	21.2 (70.2)	17.4 (63.3)	23.6 (74.5)
Record low °C (°F)	7.8 (46.0)	7.2 (45.0)	12.2 (54.0)	12.9 (55.2)	17.5 (63.5)	18.0 (64.4)	16.2 (61.2)	16.4 (61.5)	17.6 (63.7)	17.2 (63.0)	12.2 (54.0)	9.4 (48.9)	7.2 (45.0)
Average rainfall mm (inches)	12.5 (0.49)	24.8 (0.98)	17.3 (0.68)	46.2 (1.82)	144.9 (5.70)	303.9 (11.96)	319.9 (12.59)	345.7 (13.61)	319.2 (12.57)	195.7 (7.70)	53.3 (2.10)	3.6 (0.14)	1,787.1 (70.36)
Average rainy days	0.9	1.5	1.6	2.5	6.1	10.7	13.6	15.4	11.7	6.7	1.7	0.3	72.7
Average relative humidity (%) (at 17:30 IST)	70	73	76	81	81	83	85	84	83	77	72	69	78
Source: India Meteorological Department

== Demographics ==
According to the 2011 Census of India, Gangasagar had a total population of 10,340, of which 5,228 (51%) were males and 5,112 (49%) were females. There were 1,440 persons in the age range of 0 to 6 years. The total number of literate people in Gangasagar was 7,437 (83.56% of the population over 6 years).

== Civic administration ==
=== Police station ===
Gangasagar Coastal police station covers an area of 77.72 km^{2}. It has jurisdiction over parts of the Sagar CD block. The coastal police stations were formed with the objective of effective policing of the remote areas of the Sundarbans. The police has regular river patrols.

== Culture ==
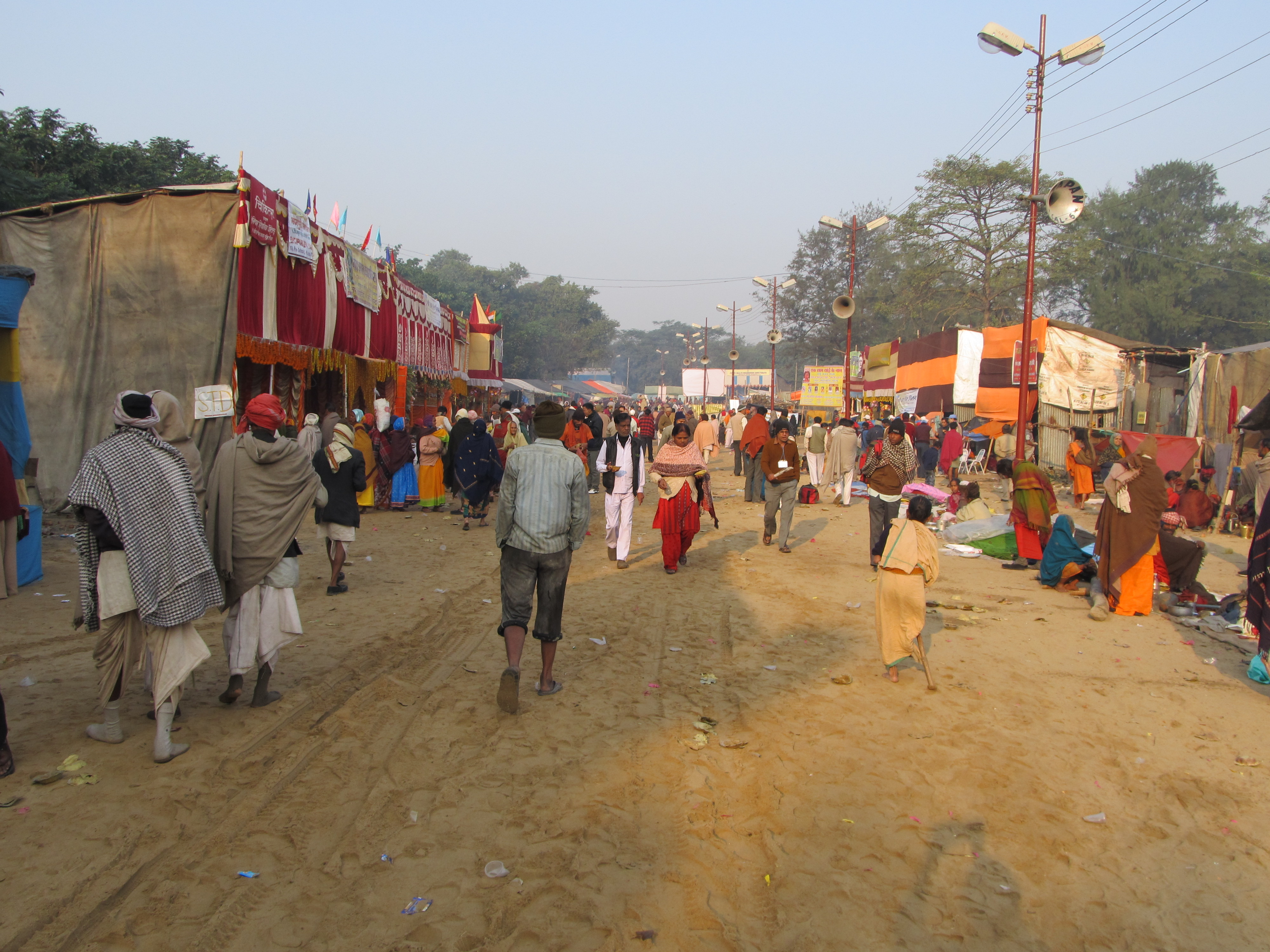
Gangasagar Fair Transit Camp, 2012

Gangasagar is a place of Hindu pilgrimage. Every year on the day of Makar Sankranti (14 January), hundreds of thousands of Hindus gather to take a holy dip at the confluence of river Ganges and Bay of Bengal and offer prayers (puja) in the Kapila Temple.

The Gangasagar Mela and pilgrimage is held annually on Sagar Island's southern tip, where the Ganges enters the Bay of Bengal. This confluence is also called Gangasagar or Gangasagara. Near the confluence is the Kapila Temple. The Gangasagar pilgrimage and fair is the second largest congregation of mankind after the triennial ritual bathing of Kumbha Mela.

In 2007, about 300,000 pilgrims took the holy dip where the Hooghly meets the Bay of Bengal on the occasion of Makar Sankranti. Almost five-hundred thousand pilgrims thronged Gangasagar in 2008. For the rest of the year about 500,000 people come to the island. According to reports on 14 January 2018, 1.8-2 million people had visited Gangasagar in 2018, against 1.5 million in 2017.

== Transport ==
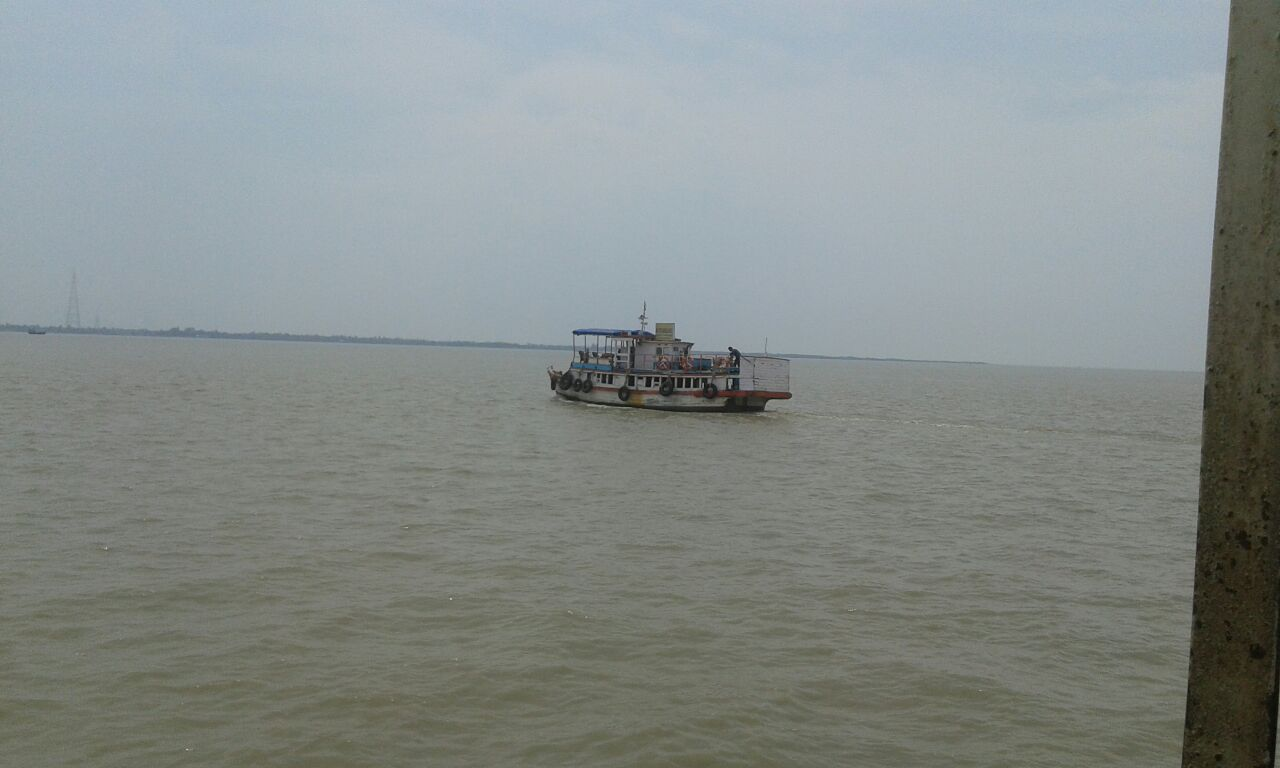
Ganga river launch service in Gangasagar

From Kolkata, Diamond Harbour Road (NH-12) runs south around 90 km to Harwood Point, near Kakdwip, where a ferry runs to Kachuberia at the north end of the Gangasagar. The Panchyat Samity maintains a parking area near the ferry landing. The ferry travels about 3.5 km across a distributary of the Ganges river (also known as Hooghly River or Muriganga river locally) to reach Kachuberia. Small boats also cross from Harwood Point to Kachuberia. Private cars and buses travel the roughly 32 km to the pilgrimage site at Gangasagar. From the pilgrimage parking area the Kapila Temple is about 200 meters and the Gangasagar confluence is about 700 meters.

== Healthcare ==
There is a primary health centre at Gangasagar, with 6 beds.
