= Namkhana (community development block) =

Community Development Block in West Bengal, India

- Community Development Block
- Location of Namkhana community development block in South 24 Parganas district
- Coordinates: 21.7699°N 88.2315°E
- Country: India
- State: West Bengal
- Division: Presidency
- District: South 24 Parganas
- Subdivision: Kakdwip
- Headquarters: Namkhana

Government
  - Gram Panchayats: Budhakhali, Frezarganj, Haripur, Mausini, Namkhana, Narayanpur, Shibrampur
  - Lok Sabha constituencies: Mathurapur
  - Vidhan Sabha constituencies: Sagar, Kakdwip

Area
  - Total: 370.61 km^{2} (143.09 sq mi)

Population (2011)
  - Total: 182,830
  - Density: 493.32/km^{2} (1,277.7/sq mi)

Demographics
  - Literacy: 85.72 per cent
  - Sex ratio: 959 ♂/♀

Languages
  - Official: Bengali
  - Additional official: English
- Time zone: UTC+05:30 (IST)
- Website: s24pgs.gov.in

Namkhana is a community development block that forms an administrative division in Kakdwip subdivision of South 24 Parganas district in the Indian state of West Bengal.

== History ==
When the Tebhaga movement broke out in 1946, the peasant movement affected several areas of what is now South 24 Parganas. Kakdwip and Namkhana were the storm centres of the movement.

== Geography ==

Namkhana CD block is located at 21.7699°N 88.2315°E. It has an average elevation of 4 metres (13 ft).

Namkhana CD block is bounded by Kakdwip CD block in the north, Patharpratima CD block and Sundarbans forests in the east, Bay of Bengal in the south and Sagar CD block, across the Muri Ganga, in the west.

South 24 Parganas district is divided into two distinct physiographic zones: the marine-riverine delta in the north and the marine delta zone in the south. As the sea receded southwards, in the sub-recent geological period, a large low-lying plain got exposed. Both tidal inflows and the rivers have been depositing sediments in this plain. The periodical collapse of both the natural levees and man-made embankments speed up the process of filling up of the depressions containing brackish water wetlands. The marine delta in the south is formed of interlacing tidal channels. As non-saline water for irrigation is scarce, agriculture is monsoon dominated. Some parts of the wetlands are still preserved for raising fish.

Namkhana CD block has an area of 370.61 km^{2}. It has 1 panchayat samity, 7 gram panchayats, 131 gram sansads (village councils), 39 mouzas and 34 inhabited villages, as per the District Statistical Handbook, South Twenty-four Parganas. Namkhana, Kakdwip and Fraserganj Coastal police stations serve this CD Block. Headquarters of this CD block is at Namkhana.

Namkhana CD block has 264 km of embankments. Breaches in these embankments varied from 6.09 km in 2006-07 to 7.2 km in 2004-05. Embankments raised along rivers are of critical importance for the safety of lives and protection of crops, against daily tides and tidal surges. Technologically the embankment structures are weak and there is need of proper drainage of accumulated rain water through sluice gates. Crude cuts in embankments for drainage of accumulated rain water and channels built for providing water to large fisheries (bheris) also add to the hazards. Cyclones and tropical depressions are regular threats.

Gram panchayats of Namkhana CD block/panchayat samiti are: Budhakhali, Frezarganj, Haripur, Mausini, Namkhana, Narayanpur and Shibrampur.

== Demographics ==
=== Population ===
As per the 2011 Census of India, Namkhana CD block had a total population of 182,830, all of which were rural. There were 93,351 (51%) males and 89,479 (49%) females. Population below 6 years was 21,701. Scheduled Castes numbered 47,260 (25.85%) and Scheduled Tribes numbered 741 (0.41%).

As per the 2001 Census of India, Namkhana CD block had a total population of 160,630, out of which 82,234 were males and 78,396 were females. Namkhana CD block registered a population growth of 19.56 per cent during the 1991-2001 decade. Decadal growth for South 24 Parganas district was 20.89 per cent. Decadal growth in West Bengal was 17.84 per cent. Scheduled Castes at 43,591 formed around one-fourth the population. Scheduled Tribes numbered 1,466.

Large villages (with 4,000+ population) in Namkhana CD block (2011 census figures in brackets): Budhakhali (5,195), Bisalakshmipur (7,439), Phatikpur (5,888), Rajnagar Srinathgram (8,293), Ganesnagar (6,635), Narayanpur (12,201), Namkhana (7,058), Debnagar (6,582), Sibnagar Abad (10,998), Dwariknagar (7,733), Uttar Chandanpiri (4,751), Dakshin Chandanpiri (4,129), Sibrampur (7,358), Rajnagar (5,055), Dakshin Chandranagar (5,719), Radhanagar (5,292), Dakshin Durgapur (5,439), Baliara (8,672), Patibania (6,987), Shibpur (6,269), Haripur (7,842), Bijaybati (4,891), Amrabati (6,675), Bagdanga (4,160) and Kusumtala (5,663).

Other villages in Namkhana CD block include (2011 census figures in brackets): Fraserganj

=== Literacy ===
As per the 2011 census, the total number of literates in Namkhana CD block was 138,117 (85.72% of the population over 6 years) out of which males numbered 75,314 (91.54% of the male population over 6 years) and females numbered 62,803 (79.64% of the female population over 6 years). The gender disparity (the difference between female and male literacy rates) was 11.90%.

As per the 2011 Census of India, literacy in South 24 Parganas district was 77.51 Literacy in West Bengal was 77.08% in 2011. Literacy in India in 2011 was 74.04%.

As per the 2001 Census of India, Namkhana CD Block had a total literacy of 78.40 per cent for the 6+ age group. While male literacy was 88.64 per cent female literacy was 67.63 per cent. South 24 Parganas district had a total literacy of 69.45 per cent, male literacy being 79.19 per cent and female literacy being 59.01 per cent.

See also – List of West Bengal districts ranked by literacy rate

Literacy in CD blocks of
South 24 Parganas district
Alipore Sadar subdivision
Bishnupur I – 78.33%
Bishnupur II – 81.37%
Budge Budge I – 80.57%
Budge Budge II – 79.13%
Thakurpukur Maheshtala – 83.54%
Baruipur subdivision
Baruipur – 76.46%
Bhangar I – 72.06%
Bhangar II – 74.49%
Jaynagar I – 73.17%
Jaynagar II – 69.71%
Kultali – 69.37%
Sonarpur – 79.70%
Canning subdivision
Basanti – 68.32%
Canning I – 70.76%
Canning II – 66.51%
Gosaba – 78.98%
Diamond Harbour subdivision
Diamond Harbour I – 75.72%
Diamond Harbour II – 76.91%
Falta – 77.17%
Kulpi – 75.49%
Magrahat I – 73.82%
Magrahat II – 77.41%
Mandirbazar – 75.89%
Mathurapur I – 73.93%
Mathurapur II – 77.77%
Kakdwip subdivision
Kakdwip – 77.93%
Namkhana – 85.72
Patharpratima – 82.11%
Sagar – 84.21%
Source: 2011 Census: CD Block Wise
Primary Census Abstract Data

=== Language ===
Languages of Namkhana CD block (2011)
1. Bengali (99.8%)
2. Hindi (0.21%)
3. Urdu (0.02%)
4. Others (0.01%)

At the time of the 2011 census, 99.76% of the population spoke Bengali, 0.21% Hindi and 0.02% Urdu as their first language.

=== Religion ===
Religion in Namkhana CD block (2011)
| Hinduism | 85.97% |
| Islam | 13.88% |
| Other or not stated | 0.15% |

In the 2011 Census of India, Hindus numbered 157,185 and formed 85.97% of the population in Namkhana CD block. Muslims numbered 25,638 and formed 13.88% of the population. Others numbered 277 and formed 0.15% of the population. In 2001, Hindus and Muslims made up 87.23% and 12.71% of the population respectively.

The proportion of Hindus in South Twenty-four Parganas district has declined from 76.0% in 1961 to 63.2% in 2011. The proportion of Muslims in South Twenty-four Parganas district has increased from 23.4% to 35.6% during the same period. Christians formed 0.8% in 2011.

== Rural poverty ==
As per the Human Development Report for South 24 Parganas district, published in 2009, in Namkhana CD block the percentage of households below poverty line was 48.17%. The poverty rates were very high in the Sundarbans settlements with all thirteen CD blocks registering poverty ratios above 30% and eight CD blocks had more than 40% of the population in the BPL category. The Sundarban region remains the most backward region in terms of quality of life. As per rural household survey in 2005, the proportion of households in South 24 Parganas with poverty rates below poverty line was 34.11%, way above the state and national poverty ratios.

== Economy ==
=== Livelihood ===
Livelihood
in Namkhana CD block
1. Cultivators (23.3%)
2. Agricultural labourers (34.1%)
3. Household industries (4.27%)
4. Other Workers (38.4%)

In Namkhana CD block in 2011, among the class of total workers, cultivators numbered 15,325 and formed 23.26%, agricultural labourers numbered 22,457 and formed 34.08%, household industry workers numbered 2,811 and formed 4.27% and other workers numbered 25,306 and formed 38.40%. Total workers numbered 65,899 and formed 36.04% of the total population, and non-workers numbered 116,931 and formed 63.96% of the population.

The District Human Development Report points out that in the blocks of region situated in the close proximity of the Kolkata metropolis, overwhelming majority are involved in the non-agricultural sector for their livelihood. On the other hand, in the Sundarban region, overwhelming majority are dependent on agriculture. In the intermediate region, there is again predominance of the non-agricultural sector. Though the region is not very close to Kolkata, many places are well connected and some industrial/ economic development has taken place.

Note: In the census records a person is considered a cultivator, if the person is engaged in cultivation/ supervision of land owned by self/government/institution. When a person who works on another person's land for wages in cash or kind or share, is regarded as an agricultural labourer. Household industry is defined as an industry conducted by one or more members of the family within the household or village, and one that does not qualify for registration as a factory under the Factories Act. Other workers are persons engaged in some economic activity other than cultivators, agricultural labourers and household workers. It includes factory, mining, plantation, transport and office workers, those engaged in business and commerce, teachers, entertainment artistes and so on.

=== Infrastructure ===
There are 34 inhabited villages in Namkhana CD block, as per the District Census Handbook, South Twenty-four Parganas, 2011. 100% villages have power supply. 34 villages (100%) have drinking water supply. 20 villages (58.82%) have post offices. 30 villages (88.24%) have telephones (including landlines, public call offices and mobile phones). 12 villages (35.29%) have pucca (paved) approach roads and 17 villages (50.00%) have transport communication (includes bus service, rail facility and navigable waterways). 7 villages (20.59%) have agricultural credit societies and 11 villages (12.64%) have banks.

=== Agriculture ===
South 24 Parganas had played a significant role in the Tebhaga movement launched by the Communist Party of India in 1946. Subsequently, Operation Barga was aimed at securing tenancy rights for the peasants. In Namkhana CD block, 6,388.12 acres of land was acquired and vested. Out of this 5,757.18 acres or 84.19% of the vested land was distributed among the peasants. The total number of patta (document) holders was 15,193.

According to the District Human Development Report agriculture is an important source of livelihood in South Twentyfour Parganas district. The amount of cultivable land per agricultural worker is only 0.41 hectare in the district. Moreover, the irrigation facilities have not been extended to a satisfactory scale. Agriculture mostly remains a mono-cropped activity.

As per the District Census Handbook, the saline soil of the district is unfit for cultivation, but the non-salty lands are very fertile. While rice is the main food crop, jute is the main cash crop.

In 2013–14, there were 95 fertiliser depots, 15 seed stores and 26 fair price shops in Namkhana CD block.

In 2013–14, Namkhana CD block produced 77,582 tonnes of Aman paddy, the main winter crop, from 32,237 hectares, 158 tonnes of Boro paddy (spring crop) from 54 hectares, 730 tonnes of wheat from 247 hectares, 992 tonnes of potatoes from 31 hectares. It also produced pulses and oilseeds.

=== Pisciculture ===
In Namkhana CD block, in 2013–14, net area under effective pisciculture was 3,204 hectares, engaging 34,343 persons in the profession, and with an approximate annual production of 72,645 quintals.

Pisciculture is an important source of employment in South 24 Parganas district. As of 2001, more than 4.5 lakh people were engaged in Pisciculture. Out of this 2.57 lakhs were from the 13 blocks in the Sundarbans.

=== Banking ===
In 2013–14, Namkhana CD block had offices of 5 commercial banks and 2 gramin banks.

=== Backward Regions Grant Fund ===
South 24 Parganas district is listed as a backward region and receives financial support from the Backward Regions Grant Fund. The fund, created by the Government of India, is designed to redress regional imbalances in development. As of 2012, 272 districts across the country were listed under this scheme. The list includes 11 districts of West Bengal.

== Transport ==
Namkhana CD block has 5 ferry services and 2 originating/ terminating bus routes.

Ukilerhat and Namkhana are stations on the Sealdah South section.

== Education ==
In 2013–14, Namkhana had 103 primary schools with 7,909 students, 12 middle schools with 1,687 students, 6 high schools with 2,657 students and 16 higher secondary schools with 10,460 students. Namkhana CD block had 1 technical/ professional institution with 100 students, 326 institutions for special and non-formal education with 14,971 students.

See also – Education in India

As per the 2011 census, in Namkhana CD block, amongst the 34 inhabited villages, all villages had schools, 33 villages had two or more primary schools, 28 villages had at least 1 primary and 1 middle school and 18 villages had at least 1 middle and 1 secondary school.

Sibani Mandal Mahavidyalaya was established at Namkhana in 2013.

== Healthcare ==
In 2014, Namkhana CD block had 1 rural hospital, 4 primary health centres and 1 NGO/ private nursing home with total 67 beds and 11 doctors (excluding private bodies). It had 37 family welfare subcentres. 4,163 patients were treated indoor and 62,306 patients were treated outdoor in the hospitals, health centres and subcentres of the CD block.

As per 2011 census, in Namkhana CD block, 2 villages had primary health centres, 34 villages had primary health subcentres, 4 villages had maternity and child welfare centres, 6 villages had veterinary hospitals, 17 villages had medicine shops and out of the 39 inhabited villages 4 villages had no medical facilities.

Dwarikanagar Rural Hospital at Dwarikanagar, with 30 beds, is the major government medical facility Namkhana CD block. There are primary health centres at Narayanpur (with 6 beds), Maharajganj (with 6 beds), Fraserganj (10 beds) and Bagdanga Mousuni (with 10 beds).
