= Kakdwip subdivision =

Subdivision in West Bengal, India

Kakdwip
- Subdivision
- Location of Kakdwip subdivision in South 24 Parganas district
- Coordinates: 21.8791446°N 88.1912992°E
- Country: India
- State: West Bengal
- Division: Presidency
- District: South 24 Parganas
- Headquarters: Kakdwip

Government
  - CD Blocks: Kakdwip, Namkhana, Patharpratima, Sagar
  - Lok Sabha constituencies: Mathurapur
  - Vidhan Sabha constituencies: Patharpratima, Kakdwip, Sagar

Area
  - Total: 1,389.95 km^{2} (536.66 sq mi)

Population (2011)
  - Total: 1,008,653
  - Density: 725.676/km^{2} (1,879.49/sq mi)

Demographics
  - Literacy: 82.04 per cent
  - Sex ratio: 953 ♂/♀

Languages
  - Official: Bengali
  - Additional official: English
- Time zone: UTC+05:30 (IST)
- Website: s24pgs.gov.in

Kakdwip subdivision is an administrative subdivision of South 24 Parganas district in the Indian state of West Bengal.

== Overview ==
Kakdwip subdivision has full rural population. The entire district is situated in the Ganges Delta. The southern part of the delta has numerous channels and islands such as the Henry Island, Sagar Island, Frederick Island and Fraserganj Island. The subdivision is a part of the Sundarbans settlements. A comparatively recent country-wide development is the guarding of the coastal areas by special coastal forces. The area attracts large number of tourists – Gangasagar and Fraserganj-Bakkhali are worth mentioning. Gobardhanpur holds a promise for the future.

== Subdivisions ==

South 24 Parganas district is divided into five administrative subdivisions:

Subdivision	Headquarters	Area (km^{2})	Population (2011)	Urban population %	Rural Population %
Alipore Sadar	Alipore	427.43	1,490,342	59.85	40.15
Baruipur	Baruipur	1,355.44	2,396,643	31.05	68.95
Canning	Canning	1,103.73	1,140,562	12.37	87.63
Diamond Harbour	Diamond Harbour	1,264.68	2,125,758	14.61	85.39
Kakdwip	Kakdwip	1,389.93	1,008,653	0	100
South 24 Parganas	Alipore	9,960,00	8,161,961	25.58	74.42

12.36% of the total population of South 24 Parganas district live in Kakdwip subdivision.

== Administrative units ==
Kakdwip subdivision has 8 police stations, 4 community development blocks, 4 panchayat samitis, 42 gram panchayats, 217 mouzas and 202 inhabited villages.

== Police stations ==
Police stations in Kakdwip subdivision have the following features and jurisdiction:

Police Station	Area covered (km^{2})	Border (km)	Municipal town/ city	CD Block
Kakdwip	91	-	-	Kakdwip, Namkhana
Harwood Point Coastal*	169	-	-	Kakdwip
Namkhana	95.26	-	-	Namkhana
Fraserganj Coastal	34.07	-	-	Namkhana
Patharpratima	293.96	-	-	Patharpratima
Gobardhanpur Coastal	207	-	-	Patharpratima
Sagar	225.3	-	-	Sagar
Gangasagar Coastal	77.72	-	-	Sagar

Note:Certain portions of Kakdwip subdivision are within the jurisdiction of Dholahat PS in Diamond Harbour subdivision

.*Newly added

== CD Blocks ==

Community development blocks in Kakdwip subdivision are:

CD Block	Headquarters	Area (km^{2})	Population (2011)	SC %	ST %	Hindus %	Muslims %	Literacy rate %	Census Towns
Kakdwip	Ganespur	252.74	281,963	22.95	0.80	82.37	17.09	77.93	-
Namkhana	Namkhana	370.61	182,830	25.85	0.41	85.97	13.88	85.72	-
Patharpratima	Ramganga	241.9	331,823	22.95	0.80	88.91	10.72	82.11	-
Sagar	Rudranagar	282.11	212,037	26.53	0.40	87.88	11.73	84.21	-

== Gram panchayats ==
The subdivision contains 42 gram panchayats under 4 community development blocks:

- Kakdwip CD block consists of eleven gram panchayats: Bapuji, Madhusudanpur, Netaji, Pratapadityanagar, Rabindra, Ramgopalpur, Rishi Bankimchandra, Srinagar, Sri Sri Ramkrishna, Suryanagar and Swami Bibekananda.
- Namkhana CD block consists of seven gram panchayats: Budhakhali, Frezarganj, Haripur, Mausini, Namkhana, Narayanpur and Shibrampur.
- Patharpratima CD block consists of fifteen gram panchayats: Achintyanagar, Banashyamnagar, Brajaballavpur, Dakshin Gangadharpur, Dakshin Raipur, Digambarpur, Durbachati, G Plot, Gopalnagar, Herambagopalpur, Laksmijanardanpur, Patharpratima, Ramganga, Sridharnagar and Srinarayanpur Purnachandrapur.
- Sagar CD block consists of nine gram panchayats: Dhablat, Dhaspara Sumatinagar-I, Dhaspara Sumatinagar-II, Gangasagar, Ghoramara, Muriganga-I, Muriganga-II, Ramkarchar and Rudranagar.

== Education ==
South 24 Parganas district had a literacy rate of 77.51% as per the provisional figures of the census of India 2011. Alipore Sadar subdivision had a literacy rate of 81.14%, Baruipur subdivision 77.45%, Canning subdivision 70.98%, Diamond Harbour subdivision 76.26% and Kakdwip subdivision 82.04%

Given in the table below (data in numbers) is a comprehensive picture of the education scenario in South 24 Parganas district, with data for the year 2013-14:

Subdivision	Primary School		Middle School		High School		Higher Secondary School		General College, Univ		Technical / Professional Instt		Non-formal Education	
Subdivision	Institution	Student	Institution	Student	Institution	Student	Institution	Student	Institution	Student	Institution	Student	Institution	Student
Alipore Sadar	531	53,719	34	4,455	50	16,471	91	66,813	5	8,122	6	3,094	1,379	53,429
Baruipur	883	132,649	65	8,954	50	26,443	128	129,195	8	27,657	7	6,735	3,116	138,507
Canning	532	81,697	59	9,181	29	10,515	55	57,921	4	5,490	1	n/a	2,105	96,622
Diamond Harbour	1,212	116,407	61	6,680	98	38,470	145	113,147	7	20,061	5	1,774	3,140	137,378
Kakdwip	598	53,058	45	5,654	48	20,383	82	56,192	3	5,420	1	100	1,844	78,897
South 24 Parganas district*	3,756	437,530	264	34,924	275	118,282	501	423,268	27	66,750	20	11,703	11,584	504,833

.* Does not include data for portions of South 24 Parganas district functioning under Kolkata Municipal Corporation

The following institutions are located in Kakdwip subdivision:

- Sundarban Mahavidyalaya was established at Kakdwip in 1965.
- Sagar Mahavidyalaya was established at Harinbari in 1998.
- Sibani Mandal Mahavidyalaya was established at Namkhana in 2013.
- Patharpratima Mahavidyalaya was established at Patharpratima in 2001.

== Healthcare ==
The table below (all data in numbers) presents an overview of the medical facilities available and patients treated in the hospitals, health centres and sub-centres in 2014 in South 24 Parganas district.

Subdivision	Health & Family Welfare Deptt, WB				Other State Govt Deptts	Local bodies	Central Govt Deptts / PSUs	NGO / Private Nursing Homes	Total	Total Number of Beds	Total Number of Doctors	Indoor Patients	Outdoor Patients
Subdivision	Hospitals	Rural Hospitals	Block Primary Health Centres	Primary Health Centres	Other State Govt Deptts	Local bodies	Central Govt Deptts / PSUs	NGO / Private Nursing Homes	Total	Total Number of Beds	Total Number of Doctors	Indoor Patients	Outdoor Patients
Alipore Sadar	-	3	3	7	1	3	-	48	65	1,159	199	33,498	633,233
Baruipur	1	6	1	18	-	2	-	66	94	1,045	201	48,114	1,266,244
Canning	1	3	1	6	-	-	-	15	26	351	49	22,467	666,377
Diamond Harbour	1	6	3	17	-	-	-	68	95	1077	169	65,051	1,325,535
Kakdwip	1	3	1	11	-	-	-	20	36	458	73	28,707	405,501
South 24 Parganas district	4	21	9	59	1	5	-	217	316	4,090	691	197,837	4,397,890

Note: The district data does not include data for portions of South 24 Parganas district functioning under Kolkata Municipal Corporation. The number of doctors exclude private bodies.

Medical facilities in Kakdwip subdivision are as follows:

Hospitals: (Name, location, beds)

- Kakdwip Subdivisional Hospital, Kakdwip, 100 beds

Rural Hospitals: (Name, CD block, location, beds)

- Sagar Rural Hospital, Sagar CD Block, Rudranagar, 30 beds
- Dwarikanagar Rural Hospital, Namkhana CD block, Dwarikanagar, 30 beds
- Madhabnagar Rural Hospital, Patharpratima CD block, Madhababnar, 30 beds

Block Primary Health Centres: (Name, CD block, location, beds)

- Harendranagar Block Primary Health Centre, Kakdwip CD block, Harendranagar, 10 beds

Primary Health Centres: (CD block-wise)(CD block, PHC location, beds)

- Kakdwip CD block: Ramchandranagar (10)
- Namkhana CD block: Narayanpur (6), Maharajganj (6), Fraserganj (10), Bagdanga Mousuni (10)
- Patharpratima CD block: Gadamathurpur (10), Brajballavpur (15), Indrapur (10)
- Sagar CD block: Gangasagar (6), Mahendraganj (6), Muriganga (6)

== Electoral constituencies ==
Lok Sabha (parliamentary) and Vidhan Sabha (state assembly) constituencies in Kakdwip subdivision were as follows:

Lok Sabha constituency	Reservation	Vidhan Sabha constituency	Reservation	CD Block and/or Gram panchayats and/or municipal areas
Mathurapur	Reserved for SC	Patharpratima	None	Patharpratima CD Block
		Kakdwip	None	Kakdwip CD Block, and Budhakhali and Narayanpur gram panchayats of Namkhana CD Block
		Sagar	None	Sagar CD Block, and Frezarganj, Haripur, Mausini, Namkhana and Shibrampur gram panchayats of Namkhana CD Block
