= Kakdwip (community development block) =

Community Development Block in West Bengal, India

- Community Development Block
- Location of Kakdwip community development block in South 24 Parganas district
- Coordinates: 21.8791446°N 88.1912992°E
- Country: India
- State: West Bengal
- Division: Presidency
- District: South 24 Parganas
- Subdivision: Kakdwip
- Headquarters: Ganespur

Government
  - Gram Panchayats: Bapuji, Madhusudanpur, Netaji, Pratapadityanagar, Rabindra, Ramgopalpur, Rishi Bankimchandra, Srinagar, Sri Sri Ramkrishna, Suryanagar, Swami Bibekananda
  - Lok Sabha constituencies: Mathurapur
  - Vidhan Sabha constituencies: Kakdwip

Area
  - Total: 252.74 km^{2} (97.58 sq mi)

Population (2011)
  - Total: 281,963
  - Density: 1,115.6/km^{2} (2,889.5/sq mi)

Demographics
  - Literacy: 77.93 per cent
  - Sex ratio: 956 ♂/♀

Languages
  - Official: Bengali
  - Additional official: English
- Time zone: UTC+05:30 (IST)
- Website: s24pgs.gov.in

Kakdwip is a community development block that forms an administrative division in Kakdwip subdivision of South 24 Parganas district in the Indian state of West Bengal.

== History ==
When the Tebhaga movement broke out in 1946, the peasant movement affected several areas of what is now South 24 Parganas. Kakdwip and Namkhana were the storm centres of the movement.

== Geography ==

Kakdwip CD block is located at 21°52′45″N 88°11′29″E. It has an average elevation of 4 metres (13 ft).

Kakdwip CD block is bounded by Kulpi CD block in the north, Patharpratima CD block in the east, Namkhana and Sagar CD blocks in the south and Nandigram I CD block in Purba Medinipur district, across the Hooghly estuary in the west.

South 24 Parganas district is divided into two distinct physiographic zones: the marine-riverine delta in the north and the marine delta zone in the south. As the sea receded southwards, in the sub-recent geological period, a large low-lying plain got exposed. Both tidal inflows and the rivers have been depositing sediments in this plain. The periodical collapse of both the natural levees and man-made embankments speed up the process of filling up of the depressions containing brackish water wetlands. The marine delta in the south is formed of interlacing tidal channels. As non-saline water for irrigation is scarce, agriculture is monsoon dominated. Some parts of the wetlands are still preserved for raising fish.

Kakdwip CD block has an area of 252.74 km^{2}. It has 1 panchayat samity, 11 gram panchayats, 177 gram sansads (village councils), 39 mouzas and 39 inhabited villages, as per the District Statistical Handbook, South Twenty-four Parganas. Kakdwip and Dholahat police stations serve this CD Block. Headquarters of this CD block is at Ganespur.

Kakdwip CD block has 203.35 km of embankments. Breaches in these embankments ranged between 3.4 and 3.6 km annually. Embankments raised along rivers are of critical importance for the safety of lives and protection of crops, against daily tides and tidal surges. Technologically the embankment structures are weak and there is need of proper drainage of accumulated rain water through sluice gates. Crude cuts in embankments for drainage of accumulated rain water and channels built for providing water to large fisheries (bheris) also add to the hazards. Cyclones and tropical depressions are regular threats.

Gram panchayats of Kakdwip CD block/panchayat samiti are: Bapuji, Madhusudanpur, Netaji, Pratapadityanagar, Rabindra, Ramgopalpur, Rishi Bankimchandra, Srinagar, Sri Sri Ramkrishna, Suryanagar and Swami Bibekananda.

== Demographics ==
=== Population ===
As per the 2011 Census of India, Kakdwip CD block had a total population of 281,963, all of which were rural. There were 144,120 (51%) males and 137,843 (49%) females. Population below 6 years was 34,715. Scheduled Castes numbered 97,944 (22.95%) and Scheduled Tribes numbered 1,836 (0.80%).

As per the 2001 Census of India, Kakdwip CD block had a total population of 239,381, out of which 122,792 were males and 116,589 were females. Kakdwip CD Block registered a population growth of 25.93 per cent during the 1991-2001 decade. Decadal growth for South 24 Parganas district was 20.89 per cent. Decadal growth in West Bengal was 17.84 per cent. Scheduled Castes at 87,638 formed around one-third the population. Scheduled Tribes numbered 3,398.

Large villages (with 4,000+ population) in Kakdwip CD block (2011 census figures in brackets): Suryanagar (5,554), Ramtanunagar (6,203), Madhusudanpur (6,242), Sibkalinagar (6,674), Sitarampur (10,244), Srinagar (10,959), Kashinagar (10,356), Kalinagar (28,669), Ganespur (32,932), Ramratanpur (4,821), Chandipur (8,519), Taktipur Abad (6,832), Manmathapur (7,981), Sibnagar (4,530), Ramchandranagar (10,396), Mrinalnagar (7,851), Ramgopalpur (4,636), Dakshin Kasiabad (4,438), Harendranagar (4,494), Gangadharpur (6,514), Bamanagar (6,844), Gobindarampur (6,526), Bhubannagar (6,879), Akshyanagar (18,883) and Kakdwip (19,368).

=== Literacy ===
As per the 2011 census, the total number of literates in Kakdwip CD block was 192,692 (77.93% of the population over 6 years) out of which males numbered 106,726 (84.34% of the male population over 6 years) and females numbered 85,966 (71.22% of the female population over 6 years). The gender disparity (the difference between female and male literacy rates) was 13.11%.

As per the 2011 Census of India, literacy in South 24 Parganas district was 77.51 Literacy in West Bengal was 77.08% in 2011. Literacy in India in 2011 was 74.04%.

As per the 2001 Census of India, Kakdwip CD block had a total literacy of 70.53 per cent for the 6+ age group. While male literacy was 81.39 per cent female literacy was 59.05 per cent. South 24 Parganas district had a total literacy of 69.45 per cent, male literacy being 79.19 per cent and female literacy being 59.01 per cent.

See also – List of West Bengal districts ranked by literacy rate

Literacy in CD blocks of
South 24 Parganas district
Alipore Sadar subdivision
Bishnupur I – 78.33%
Bishnupur II – 81.37%
Budge Budge I – 80.57%
Budge Budge II – 79.13%
Thakurpukur Maheshtala – 83.54%
Baruipur subdivision
Baruipur – 76.46%
Bhangar I – 72.06%
Bhangar II – 74.49%
Jaynagar I – 73.17%
Jaynagar II – 69.71%
Kultali – 69.37%
Sonarpur – 79.70%
Canning subdivision
Basanti – 68.32%
Canning I – 70.76%
Canning II – 66.51%
Gosaba – 78.98%
Diamond Harbour subdivision
Diamond Harbour I – 75.72%
Diamond Harbour II – 76.91%
Falta – 77.17%
Kulpi – 75.49%
Magrahat I – 73.82%
Magrahat II – 77.41%
Mandirbazar – 75.89%
Mathurapur I – 73.93%
Mathurapur II – 77.77%
Kakdwip subdivision
Kakdwip – 77.93%
Namkhana – 85.72
Patharpratima – 82.11%
Sagar – 84.21%
Source: 2011 Census: CD Block Wise
Primary Census Abstract Data

=== Language ===
Languages of Kakdwip CD block (2011)
1. Bengali (99.8%)
2. Hindi (0.17%)
3. Urdu (0.02%)
4. Others (0.01%)

At the time of the 2011 census, 99.80% of the population spoke Bengali, 0.17% Hindi and 0.02% Urdu as their first language.

=== Religion ===
Religion in Kakdwip CD block (2011)
Hinduism	82.37%
Islam	17.09%
Other or not stated	0.54%

In the 2011 Census of India, Hindus numbered 232,263 and formed 82.37% of the population in Kakdwip CD block. Muslims numbered 48,181 and formed 17.09% of the population. Others numbered 1,519 and formed 0.54% of the population. In 2001, Hindus and Muslims made up 84.30% and 15.60% of the population respectively.

The proportion of Hindus in South Twenty-four Parganas district has declined from 76.0% in 1961 to 63.2% in 2011. The proportion of Muslims in South Twenty-four Parganas district has increased from 23.4% to 35.6% during the same period. Christians formed 0.8% in 2011.

== Rural poverty ==
As per the Human Development Report for South 24 Parganas district, published in 2009, in Kakdwip CD block the percentage of households below poverty line was 34.91%. The poverty rates were very high in the Sundarbans settlements with all thirteen CD blocks registering poverty ratios above 30% and eight CD blocks had more than 40% of the population in the BPL category. The Sundarban region remains the most backward region in terms of quality of life. As per rural household survey in 2005, the proportion of households in South 24 Parganas with poverty rates below poverty line was 34.11%, way above the state and national poverty ratios.

== Economy ==
=== Livelihood ===
Livelihood
in Kakdwip CD block
1. Cultivators (14.1%)
2. Agricultural labourers (38.2%)
3. Household industries (5.16%)
4. Other Workers (42.5%)

In Kakdwip CD block in 2011, amongst the class of total workers, cultivators numbered 14,216 and formed 14.12%, agricultural labourers numbered 38,503 and formed 38.25%, household industry workers numbered 5,195 and formed 5.16% and other workers numbered 42,749 and formed 42.47%. Total workers numbered 100,663 and formed 35.70% of the total population, and non-workers numbered 181,300 and formed 64.30% of the population.

The District Human Development Report points out that in the blocks of region situated in the close proximity of the Kolkata metropolis, overwhelming majority are involved in the non-agricultural sector for their livelihood. On the other hand, in the Sundarban region, overwhelming majority are dependent on agriculture. In the intermediate region, there is again predominance of the non-agricultural sector. Though the region is not very close to Kolkata, many places are well connected and some industrial/ economic development has taken place.

Note: In the census records a person is considered a cultivator, if the person is engaged in cultivation/ supervision of land owned by self/government/institution. When a person who works on another person's land for wages in cash or kind or share, is regarded as an agricultural labourer. Household industry is defined as an industry conducted by one or more members of the family within the household or village, and one that does not qualify for registration as a factory under the Factories Act. Other workers are persons engaged in some economic activity other than cultivators, agricultural labourers and household workers. It includes factory, mining, plantation, transport and office workers, those engaged in business and commerce, teachers, entertainment artistes and so on.

=== Infrastructure ===
There are 39 inhabited villages in Kakdwip CD block, as per the District Census Handbook, South Twenty-four Parganas, 2011. 100% villages have power supply. 38 villages (97.44%) have drinking water supply. 25 villages (64.10%) have post offices. 35 villages (89.74%) have telephones (including landlines, public call offices and mobile phones). 13 villages (33.33%) have pucca (paved) approach roads and 24 villages (61.54%) have transport communication (includes bus service, rail facility and navigable waterways). 3 villages (7.69%) have agricultural credit societies and 8 villages (20.51%) have banks.

=== Agriculture ===
South 24 Parganas had played a significant role in the Tebhaga movement launched by the Communist Party of India in 1946. Subsequently, Operation Barga was aimed at securing tenancy rights for the peasants. In Kakdwip CD block 6,277.88 acres of land was acquired and vested. Out of this 3,497.88 acres or 55.72% of the vested land was distributed among the peasants. The total number of patta (document) holders was 12,021.

According to the District Human Development Report, agriculture is an important source of livelihood in South Twentyfour Parganas district. The amount of cultivable land per agricultural worker is only 0.41 hectare in the district. Moreover, the irrigation facilities have not been extended to a satisfactory scale. Agriculture mostly remains a mono-cropped activity.

As per the District Census Handbook, the saline soil of the district is unfit for cultivation, but the non-salty lands are very fertile. While rice is the main food crop, jute is the main cash crop.

In 2013-14, there were 139 fertiliser depots, 16 seed stores and 42 fair price shops in Kakdwip CD block.

In 2013–14, Kakdwip CD block produced 35,304 tonnes of Aman paddy, the main winter crop, from 16,905 hectares, 83 tonnes of Boro paddy (spring crop) from 24 hectares. It also produced pulses and oilseeds.

=== Pisciculture ===
In Kakdwip CD block, in 2013-14, net area under effective pisciculture was 2,886 hectares, engaging 33,389 persons in the profession, and with an approximate annual production of 109,980 quintals.

Pisciculture is an important source of employment in South 24 Parganas district. As of 2001, more than 4.5 lakh people were engaged in Pisciculture. Out of this 2.57 lakhs were from the 13 blocks in the Sundarbans.

=== Banking ===
In 2013-14, Kakdwip CD block had offices of 8 commercial banks and 3 gramin banks.

=== Backward Regions Grant Fund ===
South 24 Parganas district is listed as a backward region and receives financial support from the Backward Regions Grant Fund. The fund, created by the Government of India, is designed to redress regional imbalances in development. As of 2012, 272 districts across the country were listed under this scheme. The list includes 11 districts of West Bengal.

== Transport ==
Kakdwip CD block has 18 ferry services and 8 originating/ terminating bus routes.

Kashinagar and Kakdwip are stations on the Sealdah South section.

== Education ==
In 2013-14, Kakdwip had 152 primary schools with 15,651 students, 5 middle schools with 466 students, 13 high schools with 5,774 students and 25 higher secondary schools with 16,082 students. Kakdwip CD block had 1 general degree college with 2,741 students, 475 institutions for special and non-formal education with 23,005 students.

See also – Education in India

As per the 2011 census, in Kakdwip CD block, amongst the 39 inhabited villages, all villages had schools, 37 villages had two or more primary schools, 35 villages had at least 1 primary and 1 middle school and 30 villages had at least 1 middle and 1 secondary school.

Sundarban Mahavidyalaya was established at Kakdwip in 1965.

== Healthcare ==
In 2014, Kakdwip CD block had 1 hospital, 1 block primary health centre, 1 primary health centre and 11 NGO/ private nursing homes with total 215 beds and 39 doctors (excluding private bodies). It had 54 family welfare subcentres. 14,110 patients were treated indoor and 177,458 patients were treated outdoor in the hospitals, health centres and subcentres of the CD block.

As per 2011 census, in Kakdwip CD block, 2 villages had primary health centres, 34 villages had primary health subcentres, 4 villages had maternity and child welfare centres, 6 villages had veterinary hospitals, 17 villages had medicine shops and out of the 39 inhabited villages 2 villages had no medical facilities.

Harendranagar Block Primary Health Centre at Harendranagar, with 10 beds, is the major government medical facility in Kakdwip CD block. There is a primary health centre at Ramchandranagar (with 10 beds).
