= Kheadaha =

- Village
- Location in West Bengal Location in India
- Coordinates: 22.4997°N 88.4598°E
- Country: India
- State: West Bengal
- District: South 24 Parganas
- CD Block: Sonarpur

Area
  - Total: 2.46 km^{2} (0.95 sq mi)
- Elevation: 9 m (30 ft)

Population (2011)
  - Total: 1,930
  - Density: 785/km^{2} (2,030/sq mi)

Languages
  - Official: Bengali
  - Additional official: English
- Time zone: UTC+5:30 (IST)
- PIN: 700150
- Telephone code: +91 33
- Vehicle registration: WB-19 to WB-22, WB-95 to WB-99
- Lok Sabha constituency: Jadavpur
- Vidhan Sabha constituency: Sonarpur Uttar
- Website: www.s24pgs.gov.in

Kheadaha is a village and a gram panchayat within the jurisdiction of the Sonarpur police station in the Sonarpur CD block in the Baruipur subdivision of the South 24 Parganas district in the Indian state of West Bengal.

== History ==
During 1946–1950, the Tebhaga movement in several parts of the 24 Parganas district led to the enactment of the Bargadari Act. Although the Bargadari Act of 1950 recognised the rights of bargadars to a higher share of crops from the land that they tilled, it was not implemented. Large tracts, beyond the prescribed limit of land ceiling, remained with the rich landlords. In 1967, West Bengal witnessed a peasant uprising against the non-implementation of land reform legislation, starting from Kheadaha gram panchayat in Sonarpur CD block. From 1977 onwards, major land reforms took place in West Bengal under the Left Front government. Land in excess of the land ceiling was acquired and distributed among the peasants.

== Geography ==
Kheadaha is located at 22°29′59″N 88°27′35″E. It has an average elevation of 9 metres (30 ft).

== Demographics ==
According to the 2011 Census of India, Kheadaha had a total population of 1,930 of which 985 (51%) were males and 945 (49%) were females. There were 211 persons in the age range of 0 to 6 years. The total number of literate persons in Kheadaha was 1,291 (75.10% of the population over 6 years).

== Transport ==
Sonarpur-Bantala Road links Kheadaha to the State Highway 3.

== Healthcare ==
There is a primary health centre, with 6 beds, at Kheadaha.
