= Namkhana =

- Village
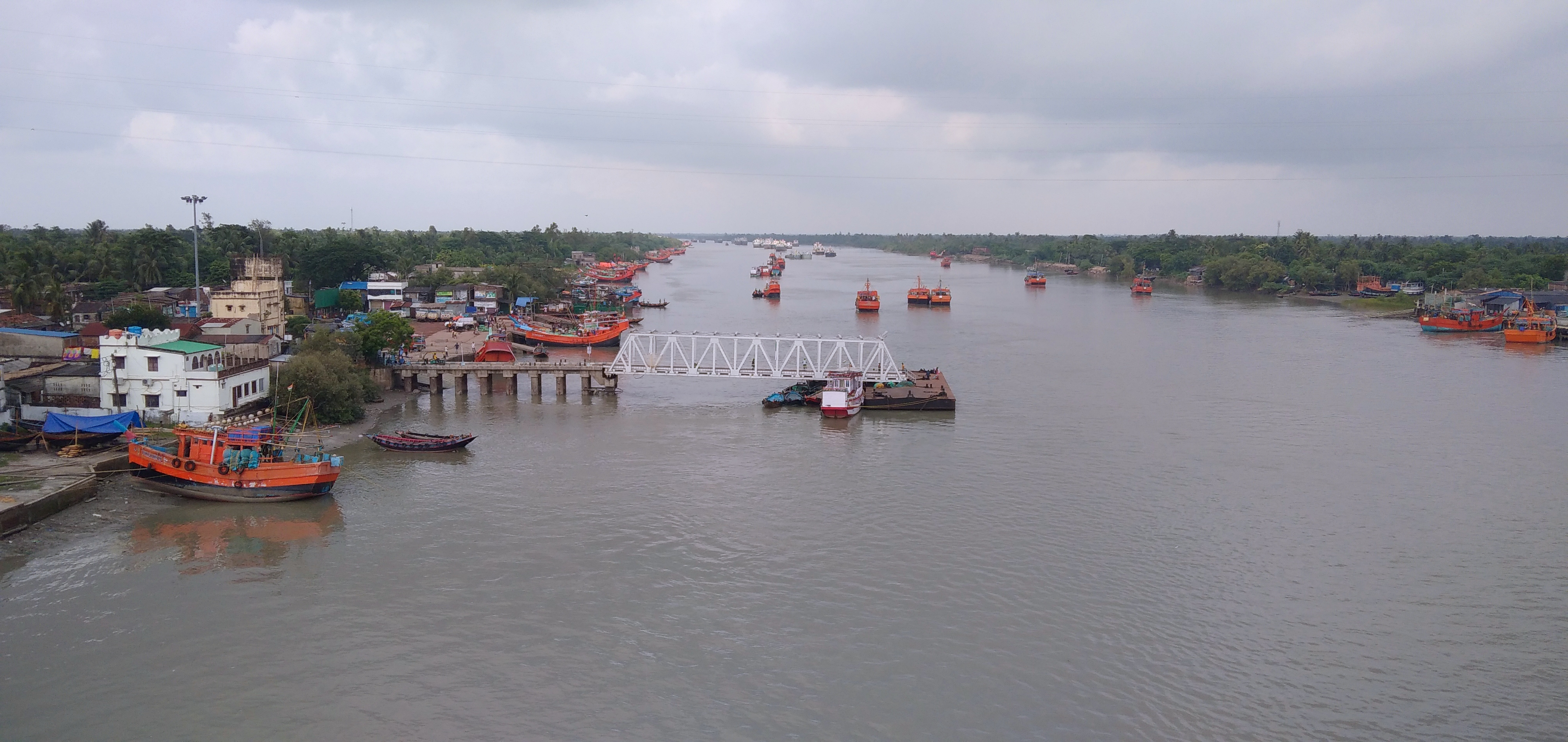

- Location in West Bengal Location in India
- Coordinates: 21.7699°N 88.2315°E
- Country: India
- State: West Bengal
- District: South 24 Parganas
- CD block: Namkhana

Area
  - Total: 7.02 km^{2} (2.71 sq mi)
- Elevation: 4 m (13 ft)

Population (2011)
  - Total: 7,058
  - Density: 1,010/km^{2} (2,600/sq mi)

Languages
  - Official: Bengali
  - Additional official: English
- Time zone: UTC+5:30 (IST)
- PIN: 743357
- Telephone code: +91 3210
- Vehicle registration: WB-19 to WB-22, WB-95 to WB-99
- Lok Sabha constituency: Mathurapur (SC)
- Vidhan Sabha constituency: Sagar
- Website: www.s24pgs.gov.in

Namkhana is a village and a gram panchayat within the jurisdiction of the Namkhana police station in the Namkhana CD block in the Kakdwip subdivision of the South 24 Parganas district in the Indian state of West Bengal.

== History ==
When the Tebhaga movement broke out in 1946, the peasant movement affected several areas of what is now South 24 Parganas. Kakdwip and Namkhana were the storm centres of the movement.

== Geography ==
Places in Kakdwip subdivision (Kakdwip, Sagar, Namkhana, Patharpratima CD blocks) in South 24 Parganas district
R: rural/ urban centre
Places linked with coastal activity are marked in blue
Owing to space constraints in the small map, the actual locations in a larger map may vary slightly

=== Area overview ===
Kakdwip subdivision has full rural population. The entire district is situated in the Ganges Delta. The southern part of the delta has numerous channels and islands such as the Henry Island, Sagar Island, Frederick Island and Fraserganj Island. The subdivision is a part of the Sundarbans settlements. A comparatively recent country-wide development is the guarding of the coastal areas by special coastal forces. The area attracts large number of tourists – Gangasagar and Fraserganj-Bakkhali are worth mentioning. Gobardhanpur holds a promise for the future.

Note: The map alongside presents some of the notable locations in the subdivision. All places marked in the map are linked in the larger full screen map.

=== Location ===
Namkhana is located at 21°46′12″N 88°13′53″E. It has an average elevation of 4 metres (13 ft).

== Demographics ==
According to the 2011 Census of India, Namkhana had a total population of 7,058 of which 3,609 are males and 3,449 are females.

== Civic administration ==
=== Police station ===
Namkhana police station covers an area of 95.26 km^{2}. It has jurisdiction over parts of the Namkhana CD block.

=== CD block HQ ===
The headquarters of the Namkhana CD block are located at Namkhana village.

== Transport ==
Namkhana is on the National Highway 12. The Hatania Doania Bridge at Namkhana connects Bakkhali with Kolkata by road.

Namkhana railway station is on the Sealdah–Namkhana line of the Kolkata Suburban Railway system.

=== Commuters ===
With the electrification of the railways, suburban traffic has grown tremendously since the 1960s. As of 2005-06, more than 1.7 million (17 lakhs) commuters use the Kolkata Suburban Railway system daily. After the partition of India, refugees from erstwhile East Pakistan and Bangladesh had a strong impact on the development of urban areas in the periphery of Kolkata. The new immigrants depended on Kolkata for their livelihood, thus increasing the number of commuters. Eastern Railway runs 1,272 EMU trains daily.

== Healthcare ==
Dwarikanagar Rural Hospital at Dwarikanagar, with 30 beds, is the major government medical facility in the Namkhana CD block.
