= Kakdwip =

Town in West Bengal, India

- Town
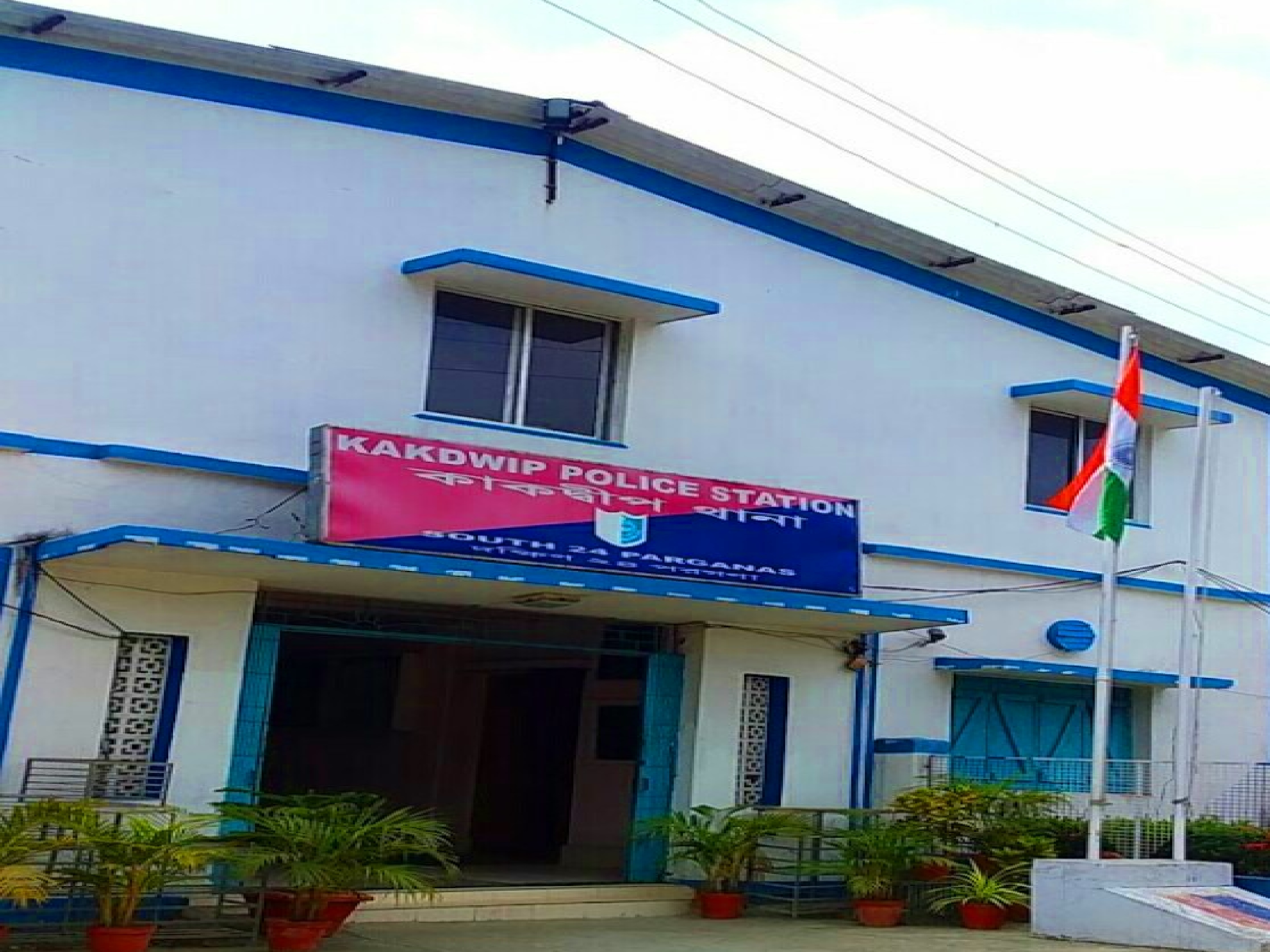
- Kakdwip Police Station

- Location in West Bengal Location in India
- Coordinates: 21.8791446°N 88.1912992°E
- Country: India
- State: West Bengal
- Division: Presidency
- District: South 24 Parganas

Area
  - Total: 5.36 km^{2} (2.07 sq mi)
- Elevation: 4 m (13 ft)

Population (2011)
  - Total: 19,368
  - Density: 3,610/km^{2} (9,360/sq mi)

Languages
  - Official: Bengali
  - Additional official: English
- Time zone: UTC+5:30 (IST)
- PIN: 743347
- Telephone code: +91 3210
- Vehicle registration: WB-19 to WB-22, WB-95 to WB-99
- Lok Sabha constituency: Mathurapur (SC)
- Vidhan Sabha constituency: Kakdwip
- Website: www.s24pgs.gov.in

Kakdwip (Bengali: [kɑːkd̪iːp]) is a town of the South 24 Parganas district in the Indian state of West Bengal. It is situated on the eastern banks of the Hooghly River. It is the headquarters of the Kakdwip subdivision.

== History ==
When the Tebhaga movement broke out in 1946, the peasant movement affected several areas of what is now South 24 Parganas. Kakdwip and Namkhana were the storm centres of the movement.

== Geography ==
Places in Kakdwip subdivision (Kakdwip, Sagar, Namkhana, Patharpratima CD blocks) in South 24 Parganas district
R: rural/ urban centre
Places linked with coastal activity are marked in blue
Owing to space constraints in the small map, the actual locations in a larger map may vary slightly

=== Area overview ===
Kakdwip subdivision has full rural population. The entire district is situated in the Ganges Delta. The southern part of the delta has numerous channels and islands such as Henry Island, Sagar Island, Frederick Island and Fraserganj Island. The subdivision is a part of the Sundarbans settlements. A comparatively recent country-wide development is the guarding of the coastal areas by special coastal forces. The area attracts large number of tourists – Gangasagar and Fraserganj-Bakkhali are worth mentioning. Gobardhanpur holds a promise for the future.

Note: The map alongside presents some of the notable locations in the subdivision. All places marked in the map are linked in the larger full screen map.

=== Location ===
Kakdwip is located at 21°52′45″N 88°11′29″E. It has an average elevation of 4 metres (13 ft).

=== Climate ===
Köppen-Geiger climate classification system classifies its climate as tropical wet and dry (Aw).

Climate data for Kakdwip
Month	Jan	Feb	Mar	Apr	May	Jun	Jul	Aug	Sep	Oct	Nov	Dec	Year
Mean daily maximum °C (°F)	25.4 (77.7)	27.7 (81.9)	31.4 (88.5)	33.1 (91.6)	33.4 (92.1)	32.3 (90.1)	30.7 (87.3)	30.8 (87.4)	31.2 (88.2)	30.8 (87.4)	28.1 (82.6)	25.1 (77.2)	30.0 (86.0)
Daily mean °C (°F)	19.9 (67.8)	22.7 (72.9)	27 (81)	29.3 (84.7)	30 (86)	29.5 (85.1)	28.5 (83.3)	28.6 (83.5)	28.5 (83.3)	27.5 (81.5)	23.5 (74.3)	20 (68)	26.3 (79.3)
Mean daily minimum °C (°F)	14.5 (58.1)	17.7 (63.9)	22.6 (72.7)	25.6 (78.1)	26.7 (80.1)	26.8 (80.2)	26.4 (79.5)	26.4 (79.5)	25.9 (78.6)	24.2 (75.6)	19 (66)	14.6 (58.3)	22.5 (72.6)
Average precipitation mm (inches)	14 (0.6)	17 (0.7)	20 (0.8)	34 (1.3)	96 (3.8)	244 (9.6)	323 (12.7)	322 (12.7)	321 (12.6)	172 (6.8)	30 (1.2)	1 (0.0)	1,594 (62.8)
Source: Climate-Data.org (altitude: 4m)

== Demographics ==
Population of Kakdwip
Year	Pop.	±%
1951	1,677	—
1961	3,017	+79.9%
1971	5,343	+77.1%
1981	7,226	+35.2%
1991	10,186	+41.0%
2001	14,704	+44.4%
2011	19,368	+31.7%

According to the 2011 Census of India, Kakdwip had a total population of 19,368, of which 9,896 were males and 9,472 were females. There were 1,872 people in the age range of 0 to 6 years. The total number of literate people was 14,173, which constituted 73.2% of the population with male literacy of 77.1% and female literacy of 69.1%. The effective literacy (7+) of population over 6 years of age was 81.0%, of which male literacy rate was 85.7% and female literacy rate was 76.2%. The Scheduled Castes and Scheduled Tribes population was 9,130 and 57 respectively. Kakdwip had a total of 4,448 households as of 2011.

== Civic administration ==
=== Police station ===
Kakdwip police station covers an area of 91 km^{2} (35 sq mi). It has jurisdiction over parts of the Kakdwip CD block.

== Transport ==
Kakdwip is on the National Highway 12.

Kakdwip railway station is on the Sealdah–Namkhana line of the Kolkata Suburban Railway system.

=== Commuters ===
With the electrification of the railways, suburban traffic has grown tremendously since the 1960s. As of 2005-06, more than 1.7 million (17 lakhs) commuters use the Kolkata Suburban Railway system daily. After the partition of India, refugees from erstwhile East Pakistan and Bangladesh had a strong impact on the development of urban areas in the periphery of Kolkata. The new immigrants depended on Kolkata for their livelihood, thus increasing the number of commuters. Eastern Railway runs 1,272 EMU trains daily.

== Education ==
- Sundarban Mahavidyalaya, established in 1965, is affiliated with the University of Calcutta. It offers honours courses in Bengali, English, Sanskrit, history, political science, philosophy, economics, geography, education, mathematics and accounting & finance, and general degree courses in arts, science, and accounting & finance.
- Kakdwip Birendra Vidyaniketan High School is a Bengali-medium coeducational school. It was established in 1969 and has facilities for teaching from class V to class XII.
- Kakdwip Sishu Sikshaytan High School is a Bengali-medium coeducational school. It was established in 1963 and has facilities for teaching from class V to class XII.
- Kakdwip Government Sponsored Ashram High School For Girls is a Bengali-medium school for girls. It was established in 1980 and has facilities for teaching from class V to class X.
- Sundarban Adarsha Vidyamandir High School is a Bengali-medium coeducational school. It was established in 1945 and has facilities for teaching from class V to class XII.
- Akshaynagar Jnandamoyee Vidyaniketan High School is a Bengali-medium coeducational school. It was established in 1969 and has facilities for teaching from class V to class XII.
- Akshaynagar Kumarnarayan Madhyamik Sikshaytan Up High School is a Bengali-medium coeducational school. It was established in 1971 and has facilities for teaching from class V to class XII.
- Bhubannagar High School is a Bengali-medium coeducational school. It was established in 1942 and has facilities for teaching from class V to class XII.
- Bhubannagar Bhubanmohan Vidyapith Secondary School is a Bengali-medium coeducational school. It was established in 1969 and has facilities for teaching from class V to class X.
- Kalinagar Dwarikanath Institution Up Secondary School is a Bengali-medium coeducational school. It was established in 1970 and has facilities for teaching from class V to class X.
- Kashinagar High School is a Bengali-medium coeducational school. It was established in 1968 and has facilities for teaching from class V to class XII.

== Healthcare ==
Kakdwip Subdivisional and Super speciality Hospital, with 100 beds, is the major government medical facility in the Kakdwip subdivision.
