= Tebhaga movement =

Peasant movement in India

- Part of the Cold War and peasant revolution against Britain
Location	Bengal Presidency, India

Belligerents
British Raj	Communist Party of India: Local peasantry

Commanders and leaders
Bengal Presidency	Charu Majumdar; Kansari Halder; Ila Mitra; Moni Singh; Bishnu Chattopadhyay; M.A. Rasul; Moni Guha; Haji Mohammad Danesh; Sushil Sen; Subodh Roy; Ganesh Das; Abani Lahiri; Gurudas Talukdar; Samar Ganguly; Bimola Mandal; Sudher Mukherjee; Sudipa Sen; Moni Krishna Sen; Budi Ma; Niyamat Ali

Units involved
Police Service	Bengal group

The Tebhaga movement (1946–1947) was significant peasant agitation, initiated in Bengal by the All India Kisan Sabha of peasant front of the Communist Party of India.

== History ==
At that time, landlords required tenant farmers and sharecroppers to provide half of the crops to the landlords. The demand of the Tebhaga (sharing by thirds) movement was to reduce the landlord share to one third. In many areas the agitations turned violent, and landlords fled, leaving parts of the countryside in the hands of Kisan Sabha. In 1946 sharecroppers began to assert that they would pay only one-third and that before division the crop would stay in their godowns and not that of the Jotedars. The sharecroppers were encouraged by the fact that the Bengal Land Revenue Commission had already made this recommendation in its report to the government. The movement resulted in clashes between Jotedars and Bargadars (sharecroppers). As a response to the agitation, the Muslim League ministry in the province launched the Bargadari Act, which provided that the share of the harvest given to the landlords would be limited to one third of the total. However, the law was not fully implemented. The Bengal Land Revenue Commission popularly known as Floud Commission had made recommendation in favour of the share-croppers.

=== The movement in 24 Parganas ===
Communists supported the peasants. During the Bengal Famine of 1943 the Communist Party of India provided relief to the peasantry of the Sundarbans area. In September 1946 Bangiya Pradeshik Kisan Sabha decided to launch the Tebhaga movement. The peasant movement broke out in Kakdwip, Sonarpur, Bhangar and Canning. Kakdwip and Namkhana were the storm centres of the movement. The movement aimed at improving the share of the peasant engaged as sharecroppers. The movement continued till 1950, when the Bargadari Act was enacted. The act recognised the right of the sharecropper to two-thirds of the produce when he provided the inputs. During 1946-1950 the Tebhaga movement in several parts of the 24 Parganas district led to the enactment of the Bargadari Act. Although the Bargadari Act of 1950 recognised the rights of bargadars to a higher share of crops from the land that they tilled, it was not implemented. Large tracts, beyond the prescribed limit of land ceiling, remained with the rich landlords. In 1967, West Bengal witnessed peasant uprising, against non-implementation of land reforms legislation, starting from Kheadaha gram panchayat in Sonarpur CD block. From 1977 onwards major land reforms took place in West Bengal under the Left Front government. Land in excess of land ceiling was acquired and distributed amongst the peasants. Subsequently, “Operation Barga” was aimed at securing tenancy rights for the peasants.

== In Both Bengals ==
Hindus and Muslims alike participated in this peasant movement, avoiding the riots and communal hatred of forty-six years. The principle of Indian Communist Party was peasant unity on the basis of which the Tebhaga movement spread from district to district leaving aside all fratricidal feuds. Peasant struggles in East and West Bengal were united through the formation of associations, the formation of women workers, struggle funds and political education classes. Farmers from the remote areas of Sundarbans to various parts of North Bengal raised their demand for Tevaga. The main leaders of this movement include Kansari Halder, Ganesh Das, Ajit Bose, Bishnu Chattopadhyay, Ila Mitra, Haji Mohammad Danesh, Debaprasad Ghosh (Patal Ghosh), Sushil Sen, Noor Jalal, Krishnavinod Roy, Bimal Dasgupta, Bhupal Panda, Rupnarayan Roy, Dr. Ganendranath Sarkar, Kali Sarkar. Wide participation of women was one of the characteristics of Tevaga. The first martyrs of Tevaga movement were Samir Uddin and Shivram Majhi of Talpukur village of Chirirbandar upazila of Dinajpur district. Samir Uddin was a Muslim and Shivram Majhi belonged to the tribal Hasda community.

== Impact ==
Hare Krishna Konar played a leading role in getting surplus land held by big land owners in excess of land ceiling laws and kept ‘benami’ (or false names) vested with the state. The quantum of land thus vested was around one million acres (4,000 km^{2}) of good agricultural land. Subsequently, under the leadership of Benoy Choudhury, this land was distributed amongst 2.4 million landless and poor farmers.

Acting on the request of the local gentry, police suppressed the movement, jailing peasants and their communist supporters.
