= National Highway 12 (India) =

National highway in India

National Highway 12
- Map of National Highway 12 in red
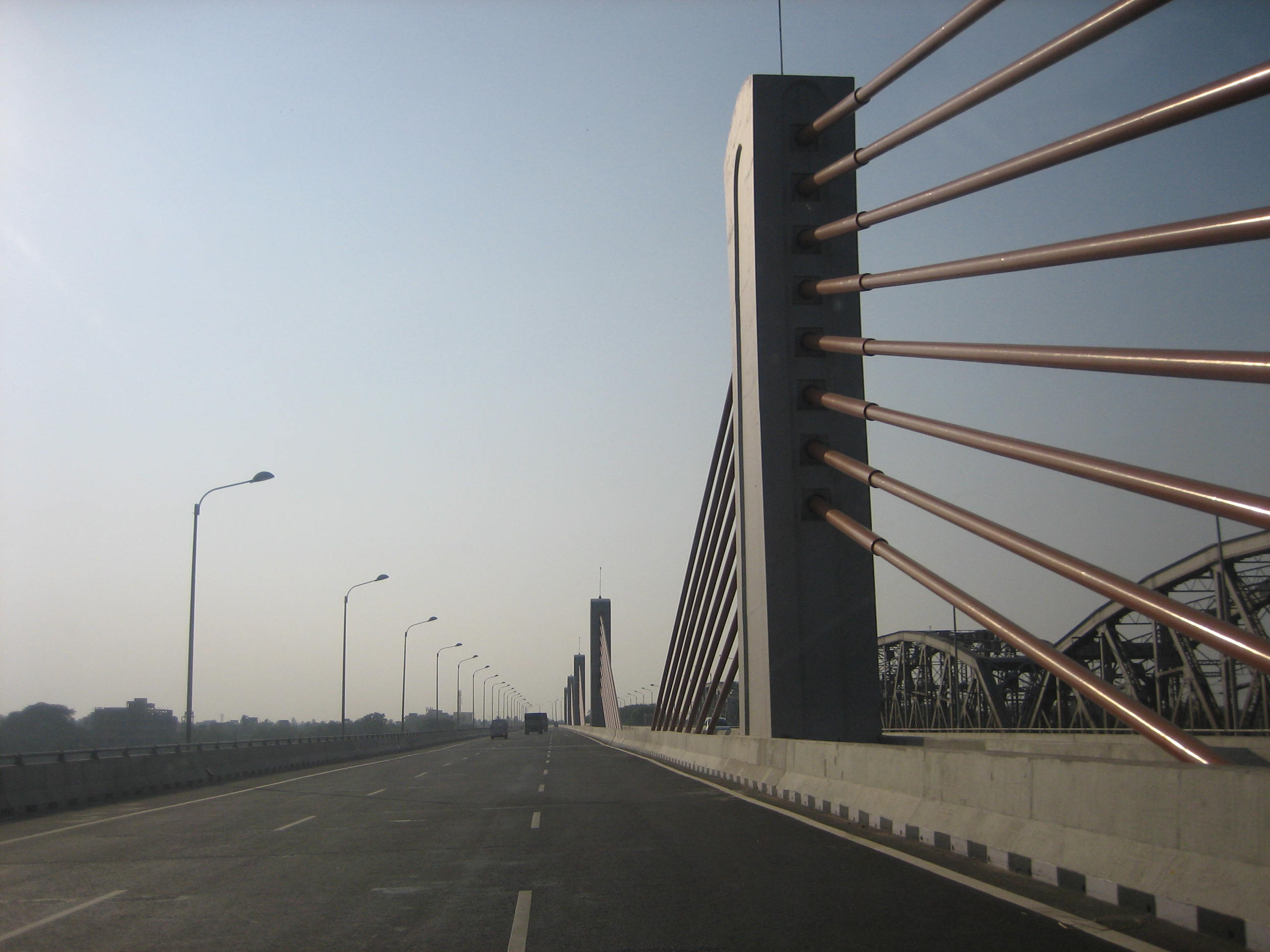
- Nivedita Setu over NH 12 in Kolkata

Route information
- Part of AH1
- Length: 612 km (380 mi)

Major junctions
- North end: NH 27 in Dalkhola, West Bengal
- List: NH 512 in Gazole, West Bengal; NH 31 in Malda, West Bengal; NH 33 in Farakka, West Bengal; NH 133A in Dhuliyan, West Bengal; NH 312 in Raghunathganj, West Bengal; NH 112 in Barasat, West Bengal; NH 14 in Morgram, West Bengal; NH 16 / NH 19 in Kolkata, West Bengal
- South end: Bakkhali, West Bengal

Location
- Country: India
- States: West Bengal: 612 km
- Primary destinations: Raiganj; Malda; Berhampore; Krishnanagar; Ranaghat; Barasat; Kolkata

Highway system
- Roads in India; Expressways; National; State; Asian
← NH 11	→ NH 13

National Highway 12 (NH 12) is a National Highway in India which runs entirely in West Bengal. It runs from its junction with NH 27 at Dalkhola terminating at Bakkhali.

Prior to renumbering, the section between Dalkhola and Kolkata was known as NH 34, while the segment between Kolkata and Bakkhali was known as NH 117.

== Route ==
NH 12 originates from its junction with NH 27 at Dalkhola in Uttar Dinajpur district and passes through Karandighi, Raiganj, Malda, passes over the Farakka Barrage, Umarpur, Aurangabad, Berhampore, Beldanga, Bethuadahari, Krishnanagar, Ranaghat, Barasat, Belghoria Expressway, Dankuni, Santragachi, Behala, Joka, Diamond Harbour, Kakdwip and ends at Bakkhali.

== Development ==
In 2020, widening of a stretch of 66 kilometres (41 mi) from Jagulia to Krishnanagar in Nadia began. From 2021, works ongoing for Baharampur Bypass construction to bypass Baharampur Town, Road Overbridge at Ranaghat, Down Bridge on River Jalangi at Krishnanagar & River Churni at Ranaghat are being constructed. Work on Shantipur Bypass is being made along with construction of Kalyani Expressway link at Barjaguli is ongoing. Plan is to link NH 19 at Dankuni with NH 12 at Barjaguli via Kalyani, New Ishwar Gupta Bridge, Magra, Baidyabati, Serampore(Srirampur) & Uttarpara, so that Trucks going to Northern West Bengal from NH 16 & NH 49 can bypass Kolkata, Barasat & Jessore Road decreasing pressure on NH 12. Reconstruction of Kalyani Expressway from Belghoria Expressway is also being executed under NH 12 redevelopment scheme.

In 2021 union budget, central government allocated highway projects for four election bound states, of which ₹25,000 crore (US$2.6 billion) was allocated for the development of 612 kilometres (380 mi) of this highway.

== Cities and towns of NH 12 ==
- Dalkhola(Xing towards Siliguri, Purnia & Katihar)
- Karandighi
- Raiganj
- Gazole(Xing towards Balurghat)
- Malda(Xing towards Rajshahi, Bangladesh)
- Sujapur
- Kaliachak
- Farakka(Xing towards NH 33)
- Dhuliyan
- Aurangabad, West Bengal
- Morgram(Staring point NH 14 to Kharagpur)
- Jangipur
- Baharampur(Xing towards Lalgola & Jalangi)
- Beldanga
- Bethuadahari
- Krishnanagar(Xing towards Nabadwip Dham)
- Shantipur
- Ranaghat(Xing towards Bangaon & Gede)
- Chakdaha
- Kalyani(Xing with Kalyani Expressway)
- Barasat(Xing towards Bangaon & Hasnabad)
- Madhyamgram
- Birati
- Belgharia
- Dankuni(Xing towards NH 19 & SH 15)
- Kona(Xing towards NH 16)
- Alipore
- Taratala(Xing towards Budge Budge)
- Behala
- Amtala(Xing towards Baruipur)
- Diamond Harbour
- Kulpi
- Kakdwip(Alight here for Gangasagar)
- Namkhana(Alight here for Gangasagar)
- Bakkhali(Alight here for Frazergaunge)

== Toll plazas ==
All of NH 12 is located within West Bengal. Below is the list of all the toll plazas (districtwise) from Dalkhola(north) to Bakkhali(south).

Uttar Dinajpur
Panishala toll plaza (0+40)km
Malda
Gazole toll plaza (0+98)km
18 Mile toll plaza (0+151)km
Murshidabad
Chandermore toll plaza (0+192)km
Shibpur toll plaza (0+246)km
Nadia
Sali-Bamandanga toll plaza (0+308)km
Howrah
Nivedita Setu toll plaza (0+447)km
Vidyasagar Setu toll plaza (0+465)km
South 24 Paraganas
Namkhana Bridge toll plaza (0+572)km

== Asian Highway Network ==
The highway starting from Barasat to Belghoria is part of the AH1 (Asian Highway 1) network, which starts from Tokyo, Japan and ends in Istanbul, Turkey.

== See also ==
- List of national highways in India
- National Highways Development Project
