= Muri Ganga River =

Coordinates: 21°39′43″N 88°08′33″E

Muri Ganga River Baratala River

Location
- Country: India
- State: West Bengal

Physical characteristics
- Discharge
  - location: Bay of Bengal

Muri Ganga River (also called Baratala River or Channel Creek) is a distributary of the Hooghly in South 24 Parganas district in the Indian state of West Bengal.

Before joining the Bay of Bengal, the Hooghly bifurcates with one channel passing east of Sagar Island. This channel is called the Baratala River or Channel Creek. It is locally known as Muri Ganga.
