= Sundarbans settlements =

Human settlements in West Bengal, India

The Sundarbans settlements refer to the areas of the Sundarbans that were cleared of forests for human habitation in the present North 24 Parganas and the South 24 Parganas districts in the Indian state of West Bengal.

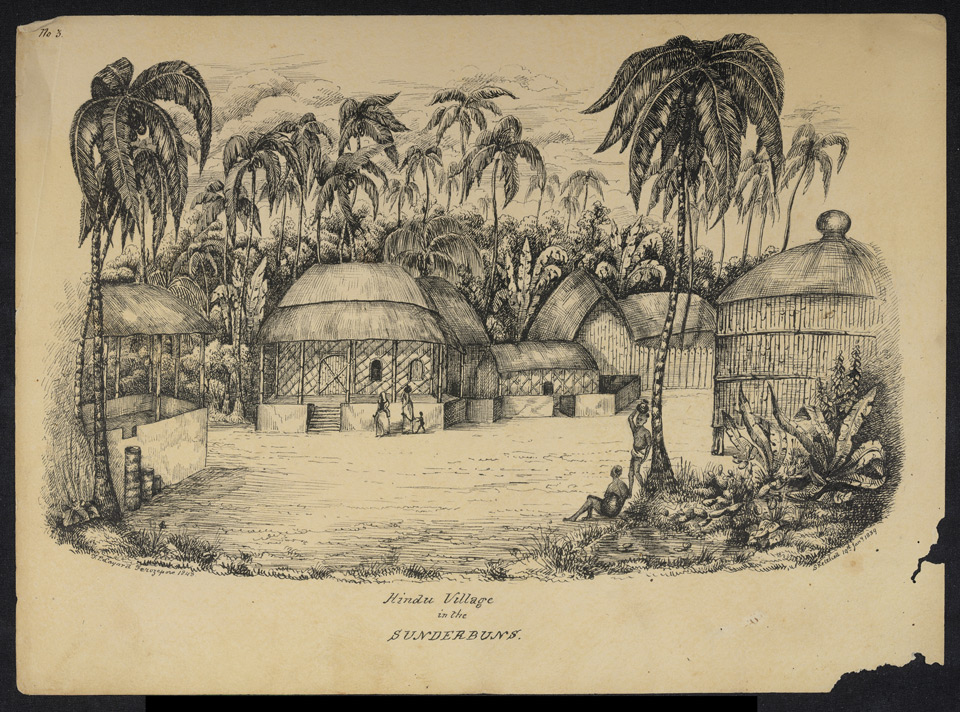
Village in a clearing of Sundarbans. Drawing by Frederic Peter Layard after an original sketch of 1839

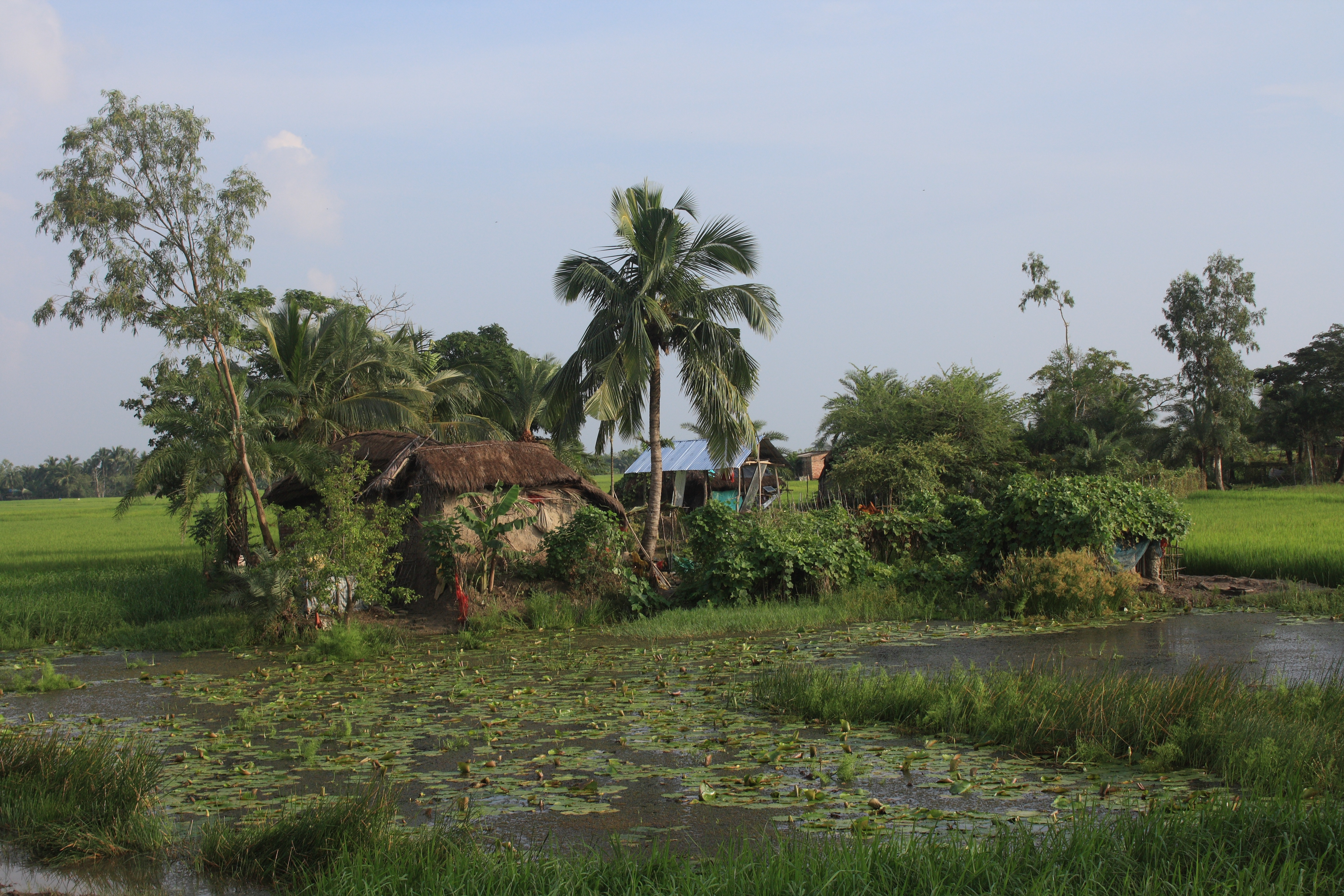
House in Sundarbans with a pond and rice fields, 2010

== Overview ==
Sundarbans settlements: Some important administrative locations in the area cleared of forests for the purpose of human habitation
R: rural/ urban centre, CT: census town
Places linked with coastal activity are marked in blue
Owing to space constraints in the small map, the actual locations in a larger map may vary slightly

As per the District Human Development Report for the South 24 Parganas, the Sundarbans area, in the southern part of the erstwhile 24 Parganas district, includes 102 deltaic islands, out of which 54 are inhabited and the rest is reserved forest. The area spread over 25,500 km^{2} having around 3.9 million people or about 40% of the total population of the area. According to the December 2001 census there were 271 Royal Bengal Tigers and other animals in the Indian portion of the Sundarban forest, spread across 9.630 km^{2}. The floor of the Sundarbans varies from 0.9 m to 2.11 m above sea level. Tidal saline water from the Bay of Bengal alternatively drowns and exposes the islands twice a day throughout the year. Around 3,500 km of earthen embankments, protecting the inhabited islands, have been facing the daily onslaught in a cyclone-prone area for more than a century.

Amitav Ghosh writes that, Sir Daniel Mackinnon Hamilton, a Scotsman, had travelled to Kolkata to work for the MacKinnon & McKenzie, a company with which he had family connections. The company sold tickets for P&O shipping line, then one of the largest in the world. Hamilton became head of the company and master of an immense fortune, one of the richest men in British India. Another man may have taken his money and gone away but Hamilton set his eyes on the deltaic islands in south Bengal. In 1903, he bought 40 square kilometres (10,000 acres) of the tide country from the government – it included such islands as Gosaba, Rangabelia, and Satjelia. His efforts at developing these places brought in other people into these islands. They were people who dared not only to struggle against nature but also the predators that lived there – tigers, crocodiles, sharks and lizards. They killed so many people that Hamilton gave rewards to people who killed them.

In December 1932, Rabindranath Tagore visited and stayed at Gosaba in the house of Sir Daniel Hamilton.

Note: The map alongside presents some of the notable administrative locations in the Sundarbans settlements. All places marked in the map are linked in the larger full screen map.

== History ==
Our knowledge of the past of the Sundarbans area is patchy. However, various tracts of what is now the South 24 Parganas have recognisable historical antecedents. Scholars accept that the more accessible and less hostile areas of the Indian portion of the Sundarbans had human habitation till the 15-16th century. From that time, geological and tectonic movements resulted in the main course of the Ganges shifting eastward and the Padma becoming the main distributary of the Ganges. Consequently, there was a marked decline in the supply of fresh water to what is now the Indian Sundarbans. Long before the British came, there were people like Mubarra Ghazi, a fakir, who converted the forested western (left) bank of the Hooghly into paddy lands. The forests were the Sundarbans fresh water swamp forests, now virtually extinct. In the early 16th century, the Portuguese arrived on the scene. The estuarine southern parts of Bengal remained under effective control of the Portuguese pirates and free-booters. The Arakanese pirates were also there. The area got depopulated and the forests extended.

With the treaty of 1757 between Mir Jafar and the East India Company, the British acquired the zamindari rights of the 24 Parganas. The area around Kolkata was uncultivated waste land and the western limit of the Sundarbans was just about 7 miles away. The British were keen to bring the Sundarbans under cultivation and convert them into revenue paying assets. The forest was not given a thought. Reclamation of the Sundarbans meant surveying and mapping the area. It started in 1810. Lieutenant W.E.Morrieson and his brother Captain Hugh Morrieson, worked for about a decade, and produced the base materials on which later maps of the area were developed. Subsequently, Ensign Prinsep worked on mapping the area. Since places did not have names, he termed the geographical areas as “lots”. In the 1830s, William Dampire and Lieutenant Hodges mapped the entire area, renumbering the lots from 1-236. “Prinseps Line” and “Dampire-Hodges Line” mark the furthest limits of the Sundarbans.

Ideas about conservation of forests started seeping in from the 1830s but the Sundarbans have shrunk dramatically. From a reasonable estimate of the forested area, at the beginning of the 19th century, at 6,550 sq miles or almost 17,000 sq km down to 10,217 sq km (5.955 sq km in Bangladesh and 4,262 sq km in India).

== Forest clearing ==
Clearing of the forests effectively started in 1781. The "present settlements originate from the plan conceived by Clod Russell, then Collector General in 1771, whereby the forest land had been divided into plots to be leased out to prospective landlords. Clearing of the forest effectively started from 1781 by Tillman Henkel, then magistrate of Jessore district". In about a century the Hingalganj, Hasnabad, Sandeshkhali I, Sandeshkhali II, Minakhan and Haroa CD blocks (all in the North 24 Parganas district in 2016), the Canning I, Canning II, Jaynagar I, Jaynagar II, Mathurapur I, Mathurapur II and Sagar CD blocks (all in the South 24 Parganas district in 2016) had been fully or substantially cleared of forests. Thereafter, much of the interiors of the Kakdwip, Namkhana, Patharpratima, Basanti, Kultali and Gosaba CD blocks were cleared for human settlement. People started moving into the area. The refugees from the erstwhile East Pakistan were the last to come in large numbers between 1951 and 1971. The Canning I, Canning II, Jaynagar I, Jaynagar II, Mathurapur I, Mathurapur II, Kakdwip and Namkhana CD blocks are a little away from the forests and are being attached/ connected to the mainland. Their conditions are similar to the other mainland CD blocks in the district, but the Basanti, Gosaba, Kultali, Patharpratima and Sagar CD blocks are largely isolated from the mainland. These islands are mostly separated from the deep forest by a river.

Electric connections are rare, and transport and communications, other than river transport, are not there. Around 95% people depend on rain-fed agriculture. The Sagar CD block lies at the mouth of the Hooghly River, which carries fresh water and so things are a little different there. The sea level, around India, is estimated to be rising at 2.55 mm per year. In the last 70 years, 220 km^{2} of forest land has been submerged and the process continues.

== Poverty ==
As per the Human Development Report for the South 24 Parganas district, published in 2009, the poverty rates were very high in the Sundarban region with all the thirteen CD blocks registering poverty ratios above 30% and eight CD blocks had more than 40% of the population in the BPL category. The Sundarban region remains the most backward region in terms of quality of life. As per rural household survey in 2005, the proportion of households in the South 24 Parganas with poverty rates below poverty line was 34.11%, way above the state and national poverty ratios. As per the Human Development Report for North 24 Parganas district, the economic scenario is equally gloomy, except for Hasnabad and Sandeshkhali II CD blocks, both of which had population below poverty line at slightly below 30%. Two blocks had between 30 and 40%, one between 40 and 50% and the highest at 59.7%.

Physiographically the Sundarbans consist of the marine delta zone. As the sea receded southwards, in the sub-recent geological period, a large low-lying plain got exposed. Both tidal inflows and the rivers have been depositing sediments in this plain. In the Sundarbans overwhelming majority of the population is dependent on agriculture. The saline soil of the area is unfit for cultivation. Moreover, the irrigation facilities have not been extended to a satisfactory scale. Agriculture mostly remains a mono-cropped activity.

== Dominique Lapierre's floating hospitals ==
Four launches with doctors carrying medicines, sophisticated portable X-ray and echo-cardiograph machines, provided by the French author Dominique Lapierre move along the waterways of the Sundarbans to its furthest corners. Residents of such places as Sandeshkhali, Basanti, Gosaba and Kultali have expressed their gratitude to him for his support when he came in 2004. Since 1981, Lapierre has dedicated half of his royalty earnings from his books to sustain a humanitarian movement in the slums of Kolkata and the deprived areas of rural Bengal. For his work, Lapierre was made a citizen of honour of Kolkata. He was awarded the Padma Bhushan in the 2008 Republic Day honours list.

As of 2007, over the years Lapierre's foundation has an enviable record in the Sunderbans: 100,000 people with tuberculosis have been treated, floating operation rooms have carried out 3,000 operations, 9,000 children have been treated for leprosy and they perform 30 cataract operations per day. A major portion of his book royalties amounting to about $3 million annually was spent in the Sundarbans,

As of 2010, Lapiere’s foundation was operating 14 projects in India mostly in the Sundarbans. His floating dispensaries covered 54 islands. He is seeking support for projects for the poor, but the response is not there. He says, “I want Indians to be concerned about the poor. After all, isn’t it their country too?”
