= Henry Island (India) =

Island in West Bengal, India

Coordinates: 21.5769°N 88.2923°E

Geography
- Location: Bay of Bengal
- Archipelago: Sundarbans

Administration
- India
- State: West Bengal
- District: South 24 Parganas

Demographics
- Population: none

Henry's Island is an island near Bakkhali in South 24 Parganas of West Bengal, India. It is around 130 km (81 mi) from Kolkata.

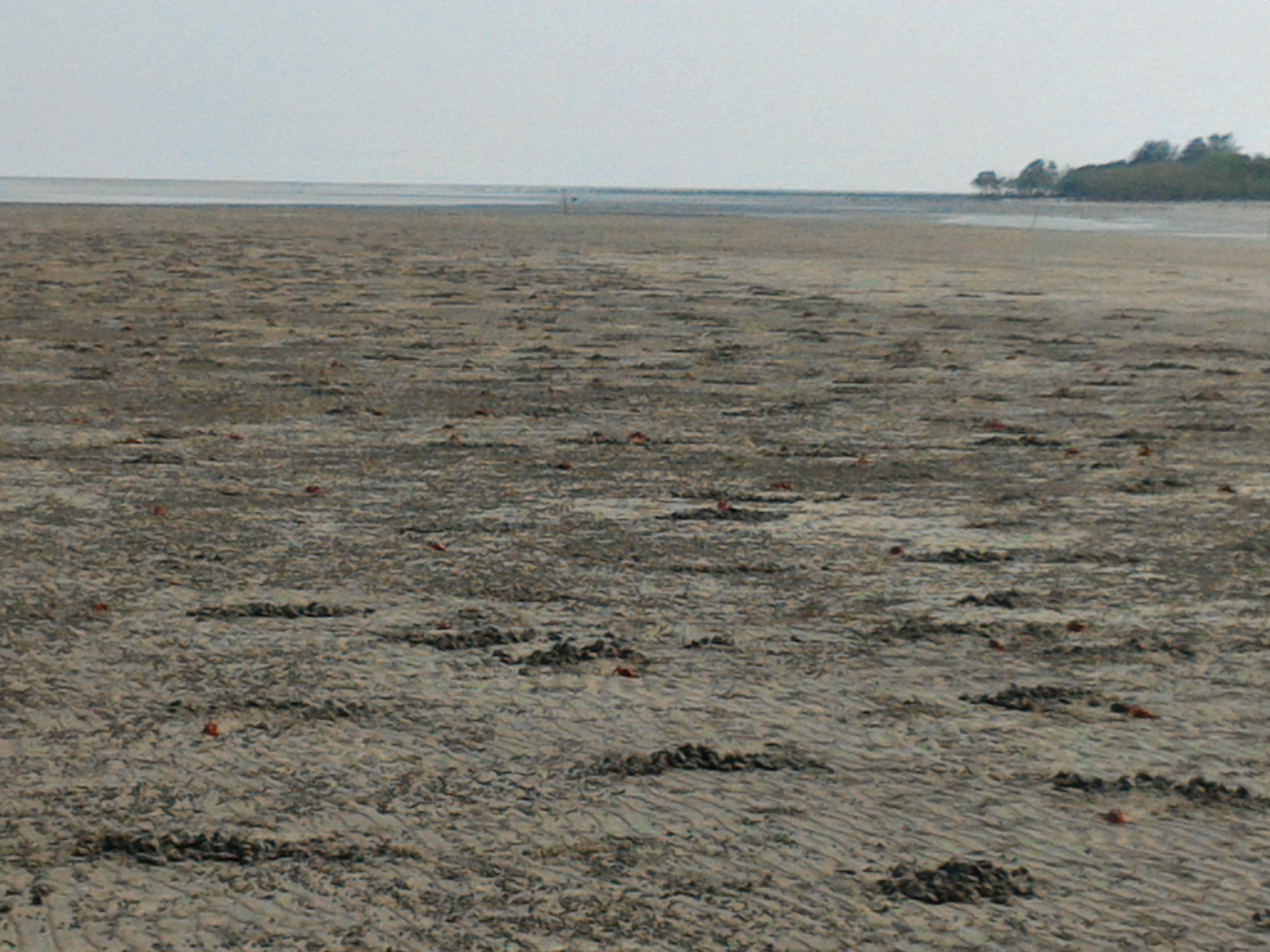
The island is home to millions of red crabs. Red crabs can be seen in this photo.

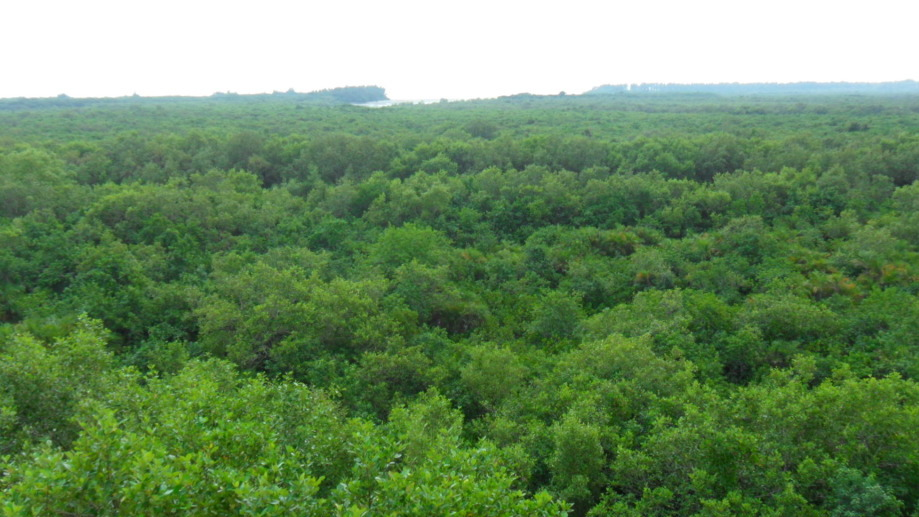
Henry's Island Tower view

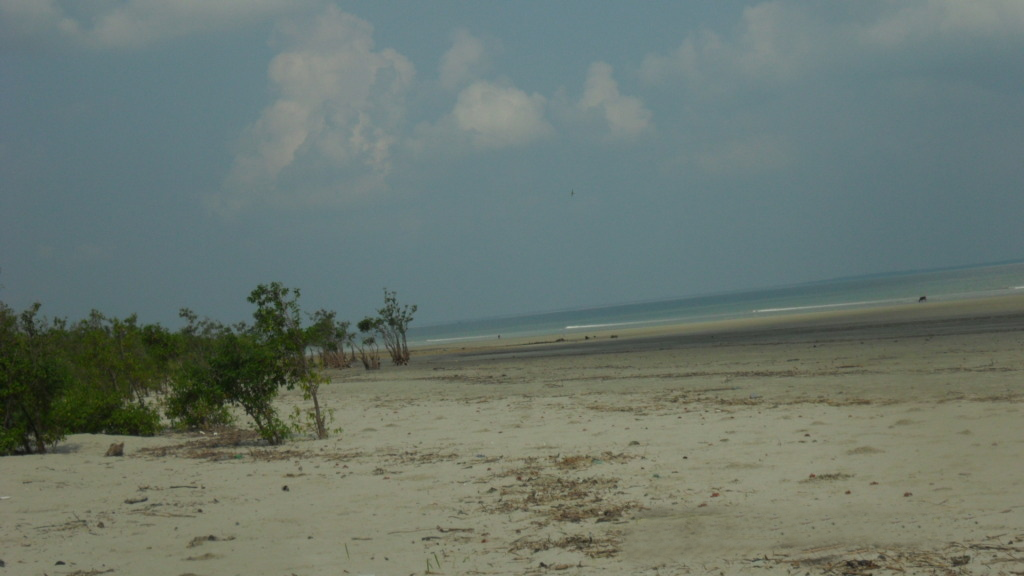
The beach of Henry's Island
