= Diamond Harbour (disambiguation) =

Diamond Harbour may refer to:

- Diamond Harbour, New Zealand, a village in Canterbury
- Diamond Harbour, India, a town in West Bengal
  - Diamond Harbour Association Football Club
  - Diamond Harbour subdivision
  - Diamond Harbour Indian parliamentary constituency
  - Diamond Harbour West Bengal Legislative Assembly constituency
  - Diamond Harbour community development block I
  - Diamond Harbour community development block II
