= Berandari Bagaria =

- Census Town
- Location in West Bengal Location in India
- Coordinates: 22.1585°N 88.2499°E
- Country: India
- State: West Bengal
- District: South 24 Parganas
- CD block: Kulpi

Area
  - Total: 4.12 km^{2} (1.59 sq mi)
- Elevation: 6 m (20 ft)

Population (2011)
  - Total: 10,748
  - Density: 2,610/km^{2} (6,760/sq mi)

Languages
  - Official: Bengali
  - Additional official: English
- Time zone: UTC+5:30 (IST)
- PIN: 743332
- Telephone code: +91 3174
- Vehicle registration: WB-19 to WB-22, WB-95 to WB-99
- Lok Sabha constituency: Mathurapur (SC)
- Vidhan Sabha constituency: Kulpi
- Website: www.s24pgs.gov.in

Berandari Bagaria is a census town within the jurisdiction of the Kulpi police station in the Kulpi CD block in the Diamond Harbour subdivision of the South 24 Parganas district in the Indian state of West Bengal.

== Geography ==
Cities and towns in the western part of Diamond Harbour subdivision (including Falta, Diamond Harbour I & II, Kulpi CD blocks) in South 24 Parganas district
M: municipal city/ town, CT: census town, R: rural/ urban centre, N: neighbourhood, H: historical place/ religious centre
Owing to space constraints in the small map, the actual locations in a larger map may vary slightly

=== Area overview ===
Diamond Harbour subdivision is a rural subdivision with patches of urbanization. Only 14.61% of the population lives in the urban areas and an overwhelming 85.39% lives in the rural areas. In the western portion of the subdivision (shown in the map alongside) there are 11 census towns. The entire district is situated in the Ganges Delta and the western part, located on the east bank of the Hooghly River, is covered by the Kulpi Diamond Harbour Plain, which is 5–6 metres above sea level. Archaeological excavations at Deulpota and Harinarayanpur, on the bank of the Hooghly River, indicate the existence of human habitation more than 2,000 years ago.

Note: The map alongside presents some of the notable locations in the subdivision. All places marked in the map are linked in the larger full screen map.

=== Location ===
Berandari Bagaria is located at 22.1585°N 88.2499°E

== Demographics ==
According to the 2011 Census of India, Berandari Bagaria had a total population of 10,748 of which 5,462 (51%) were males and 5,286 (49%) were females. There were 1,747 persons in the age range of 0–6 years. The total number of literate persons in Berandari Bagaria was 6,570 (72.99% of the population over 6 years).

== Infrastructure ==
According to the District Census Handbook 2011, Berandari Bagaria covered an area of 4.1202 km^{2}. Among the civic amenities, the protected water supply involved overhead tank. It had 834 domestic electric connections. Among the medical facilities, it had a hospital 1.5 km away and 5 medicine shops in the town. Among the educational facilities it had were 5 primary schools. The nearest middle school was at Bagaria 0.5 km away, the nearest secondary school at Chandipur 0.5 km away, the nearest senior secondary school at Hatuganj 2.5 km away, the nearest general degree college at Diamond Harbour 9 km away. It had a polytechnic. Three important commodities it produced were paddy, vegetables and fish.

== Transport ==
Berandari Bagaria is on the National Highway 12.

Kulpi railway station is located nearby.

== Healthcare ==
Kulpi Block Primary Health Centre at Kulpi, with 15 beds, is the major government medical facility in the Kulpi CD block.
