= Masat, Diamond Harbour =

Masat
- Census Town
- Location in West Bengal Location in India
- Coordinates: 22.2615°N 88.2454°E
- Country: India
- State: West Bengal
- District: South 24 Parganas
- CD block: Diamond Harbour I

Area
  - Total: 1.71 km^{2} (0.66 sq mi)
- Elevation: 8 m (26 ft)

Population (2011)
  - Total: 5,839
  - Density: 3,410/km^{2} (8,840/sq mi)

Languages
  - Official: Bengali
  - Additional official: English
- Time zone: UTC+5:30 (IST)
- PIN: 743375
- Telephone code: +91 3174
- Vehicle registration: WB-19 to WB-22, WB-95 to WB-99
- Lok Sabha constituency: Diamond Harbour
- Vidhan Sabha constituency: Diamond Harbour
- Website: www.s24pgs.gov.in

Masat is a census town and a gram panchayat within the jurisdiction of the Diamond Harbour police station in the Diamond Harbour I CD block in the Diamond Harbour subdivision of the South 24 Parganas district in the Indian state of West Bengal.

== Geography ==
Cities and towns in the western part of Diamond Harbour subdivision (including Falta, Diamond Harbour I & II, Kulpi CD blocks) in South 24 Parganas district
M: municipal city/ town, CT: census town, R: rural/ urban centre, N: neighbourhood, H: historical place/ religious centre
Owing to space constraints in the small map, the actual locations in a larger map may vary slightly

=== Area overview ===
Diamond Harbour subdivision is a rural subdivision with patches of urbanization. Only 14.61% of the population lives in the urban areas and an overwhelming 85.39% lives in the rural areas. In the western portion of the subdivision (shown in the map alongside) there are 11 census towns. The entire district is situated in the Ganges Delta and the western part, located on the east bank of the Hooghly River, is covered by the Kulpi Diamond Harbour Plain, which is 5–6 metres above sea level. Archaeological excavations at Deulpota and Harinarayanpur, on the bank of the Hooghly River indicate the existence of human habitation more than 2,000 years ago.

Note: The map alongside presents some of the notable locations in the subdivision. All places marked in the map are linked in the larger full screen map.

=== Location ===
Masat is located at 22.2615°N 88.2454°E

== Demographics ==
According to the 2011 Census of India, Masat had a total population of 5,839 of which 2,984 (51%) were males and 2,855 (49%) were females. There were 756 persons in the age range of 0–6 years. The total number of literate persons in Masat was 4,110 (80.86% of the population over 6 years).

== Infrastructure ==
According to the District Census Handbook 2011, Masat covered an area of 1.7082 km^{2}. Among the civic amenities, the protected water supply involved tubewell/ boreholes. It had 496 domestic electric connections. Among the medical facilities, it had a dispensary/ health centre, family welfare centre, veterinary hospital nearby. Among the educational facilities it had were 2 primary schools, 1 middle school, 1 secondary school, 1 senior secondary school, the nearest general degree college at Diamond Harbour 15 km away. Three important commodities it produced were: paddy, vegetables, sunflower.

== Transport ==
Masat is on the Usthi-Magrahat Road, which links it to the National Highway 12 / Diamond Harbour Road.

== Education ==
Masat High School is a Bengali-medium coeducational institution established in 1909. It has facilities for teaching from class V to class XII.

Masat Girls’ High School is a Bengali-medium girls only institution established in 1974. It has facilities for teaching from class V to class XII.

== Healthcare ==
There is a primary health centre with 6 beds at Raghunathpur (Masat).
