= Nilratan Sircar =

Indian doctor

Sir Nilratan Sircar
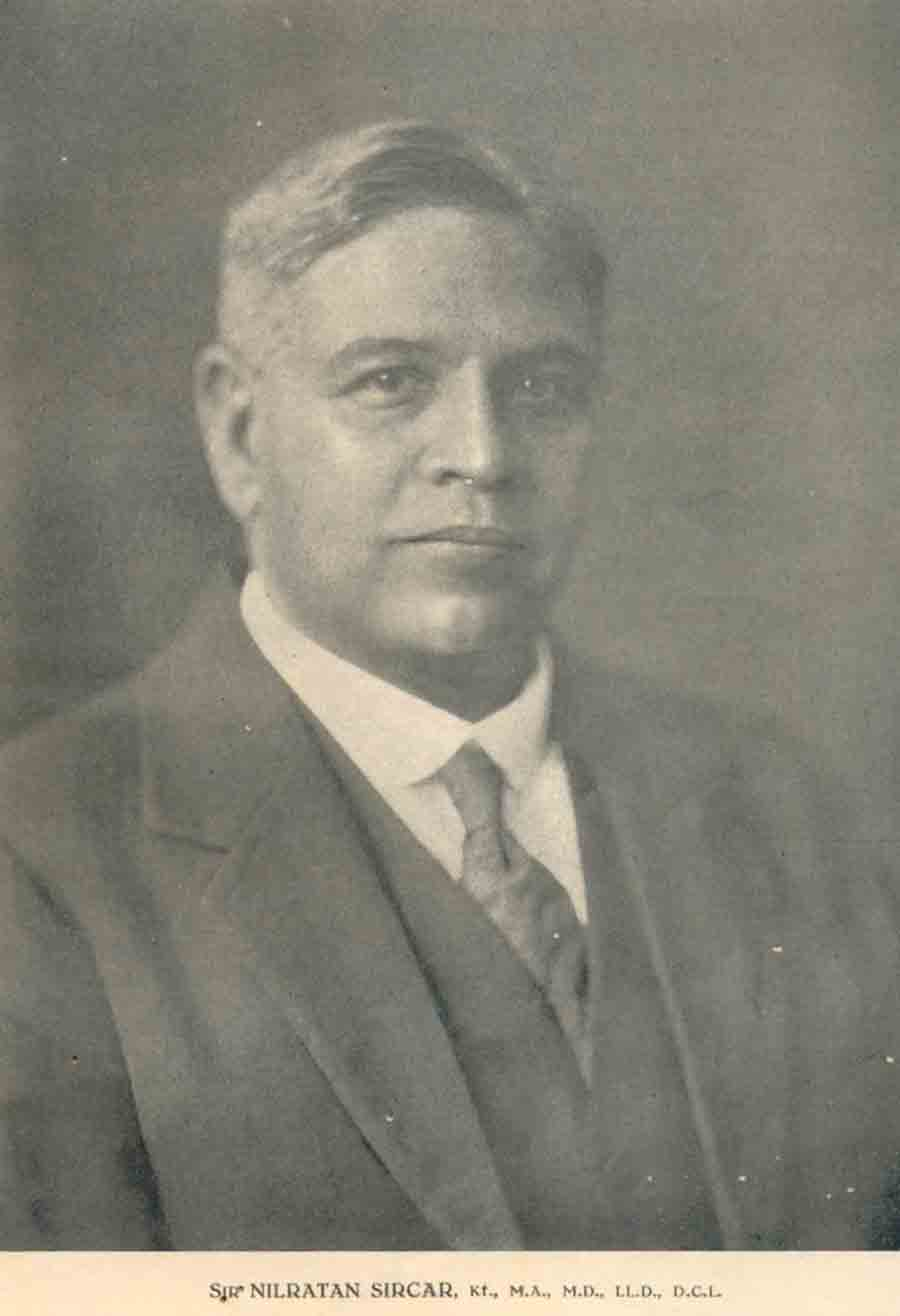
- Born: 1 October 1861; Netra, Bengal Presidency, British India
- Died: 18 May 1943 (aged 81); Calcutta, Bengal Presidency, British India
- Education: Campbell Medical College; University of Calcutta
- Spouse: Nirmala Sircar (née Majumdar
- Relatives: Jogindranath Sarkar

Sir Nilratan Sircar (1 October 1861 – 18 May 1943) was an Indian medical doctor, educationist, philanthropist and swadeshi entrepreneur. He was awarded honorary DCL by University of Oxford and LL.D. by University of Edinburgh. He was a renowned figure in promoting Science and Technology education in contemporary India.

== Early life ==
Son of Nandalal Sircar, a native of Jaynagar Majilpur, he was born in the house of his maternal uncle in Netra village of South 24 Parganas district, on 1 October 1861. His father came from an impoverished family in Jessore and later settled in Jaynagar. His mother Rebati Bani hailed from Pantihal village. However, as his mother often suffered from ill health, Sircar and his siblings spent much of their growing years with their maternal family in Netra village and subsequently moved there. His mother died in Pantihal while he was still a child from what was later believed to be cancer. Sircar was reported to have shared with grandchildren that it was this early loss of his mother to an unknown disease that led him to study medicine, as he wanted to know the cause of her death.

== Education ==
Sircar passed the entrance examination for Chatra Nandalal Institution in Hooghly and matriculated there. Despite the family's modest means, Sircar moved to Calcutta to pursue his career in medicine. His efforts caught the attention of an Englishman who sponsored his study at the Campbell Medical College in the formative years from where he obtained vernacular diploma in medicine in 1879. Later, he went on to win a scholarship, and earned the M.B. degree in 1888. The following year he earned his M.A., and in 1890 he obtained the M.D. degrees from the University of Calcutta.

== Family life ==
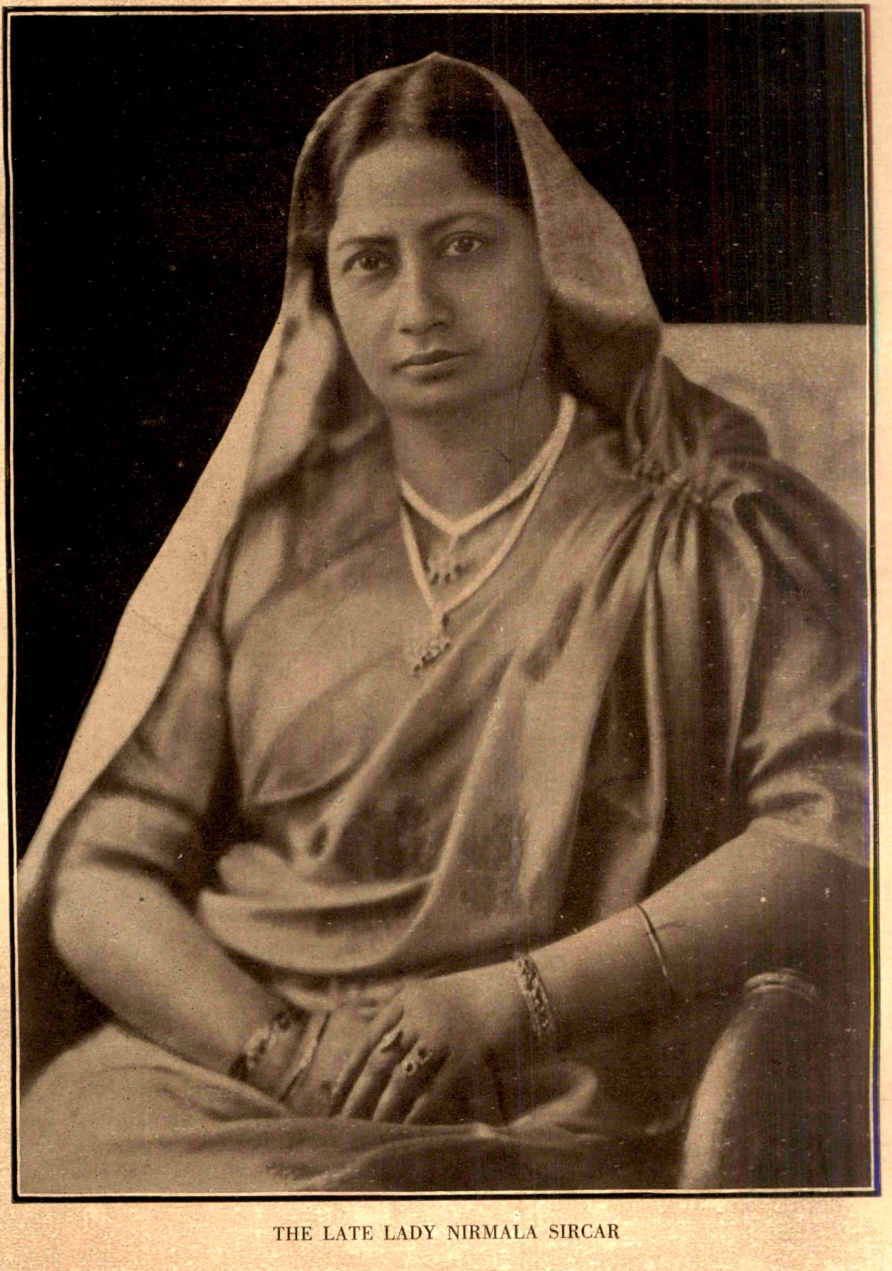
Sircar's wife Nirmala Sircar

In 1888, Sircar married Nirmala, daughter of Girishchandra Mazumdar of Barisal, a scholar and a Brahmo missionary, and became a member of the Brahmo Samaj. The couple went on to have six children, five daughters (Nalini Basu, Arundhuti Chatterjee, Shanta Sen, Meera Sen and Kamala Chatterjee) and one son Arun Prakash Sarkar.

== Medical career ==
Dr Sircar soon grew a large practice and was, for many years, a leading Indian consulting physician, travelling far and wide to treat some of his patients, who included the ruling heads of state in neighbouring countries.

== Educational endeavours ==
Aside from his contribution to the field of medicine, Dr Sircar also contributed greatly to the causes of education, commerce, and politics during his lifetime. He was directly or indirectly involved in the foundation and administration of various national institutes of science in Bengal.

=== Bose Institute ===
Sir Nilratan Sircar was the Chairman of the first Governing Body of Bose Institute, which is Asia's first modern interdisciplinary research centre.

=== Carmichael Medical College ===
Sir Nilratan Sircar became the president of Medical Education Society of Bengal in 1922 and remained in the position until 1941. The society was formed for better management of the Carmichael Medical College.

=== Science College of the University of Calcutta ===
He was one of the enthusiastic founding fathers of the Science College of University of Calcutta.

=== Indian Association for the Cultivation of Science ===
Along with other pioneers of Bengal, Sircar was deeply involved in the formation of Indian Association for the Cultivation of Science. and he remained the President of the Indian Association for the Cultivation of Science from 1939 to 1941.

=== University of Calcutta ===
Sircar's keen interests in academia saw him being closely associated with the University of Calcutta. He was elected Fellow in 1893 and was responsible for the expansion of post graduate science teaching facilities and research in medical education as well as the introduction of students' health examination and welfare work. He served as the President of the University of Calcutta's Council for Post Graduate Teaching Arts from 1924 to 1929, the President of the Post Graduate teaching in Science from 1924 to 1942 and the Vice-Chancellor of the University of Calcutta from 1919 to 1921. In 1920 he travelled to England to represent the University of Calcutta at the Empire Universities Conference in London.

=== Other institutes ===
Sircar was also closely associated with the Jadavpur Tuberculosis Hospital and Chittarajan Seva Sadan.

=== Academic clubs and societies ===
Sircar served as the President of the Calcutta Medical Club and was for many years remained the Editor-In-Chief of its Journal. He was also one of the founders of the Physiological Society of India established in 1934. During the anti-partition movement in Bengal, Sircar became involved in establishing the National Council of Education. In 1906, Taraknath Pandit and Dr Sircar launched the Society for the Promotion of Technical Education which established the Bengal Technical Institute.

== Political life ==
This was also a time of enormous political turmoil in the Indian subcontinent. The Independence movement was slowly but surely gaining momentum and here too, Sircar was at the helm of affairs. He was closely associated with several leading luminaries of that time, including Rabindranath Tagore, Mahatma Gandhi, Jagdish Chandra Bose, Motilal Nehru, Deshbandhu Chittaranjan Das and Netaji Subhas Chandra Bose. He was a member of the Indian National Congress between 1890 and 1919, Sircar also served as a member of the Bengal Legislative Congress under the reform scheme.

== Promotion of national trade ==
His enthusiastic support for the Swadeshi movement saw him set up the National Soap Factory and the National Tannery at Beliaghata in 1905. He was the Director of the Boot and Equipment Factory for period of time and encouraged his manager B.M.Das to organise the Bengal Tanning Institute.

== Death ==
He died in Calcutta on 18 May 1943 aged 81. An obituary published in the British Medical Journal on 5 June 1943 stated,

The death in Calcutta of Sir Nilratan Sircar, at the great age for a Bengali of 81, has removed a leading member of the medical profession in India.

== Awards and recognition ==
On 26 June 1918, Dr. Sircar received a knighthood for his contributions to medical education. Sircar was awarded the honorary DCL and LLD degrees by the universities of Oxford and Edinburgh respectively. In 1940, the University of Calcutta conferred on him the D.Sc. degree.

After his death, his alma mater, the Campbell Medical School was renamed Nil Ratan Sircar Medical College and Hospital. In 1931, the Calcutta Municipal Corporation felicitated him as "an eminent physician of this great city (who) has taken active part in the public life of the country for over half a century and has rendered invaluable service in various spheres of public activity.”
