= Diamond Harbour I =

Community Development Block in West Bengal, India

- Community Development Block
- Location of Diamond Harbour I community development block in South 24 Parganas district
- Coordinates: 22.1910091°N 88.1904741°E
- Country: India
- State: West Bengal
- Division: Presidency
- District: South 24 Parganas
- Subdivision: Diamond Harbour
- Headquarters: Diamond Harbour

Government
  - Gram Panchayats: Basuldanga, Bolsiddhi Kalinagar, Derak, Harindanga, Kanpur Dhanaberia, Mashat, Netra, Parulia
  - Lok Sabha constituencies: Diamond Harbour, Mathurapur
  - Vidhan Sabha constituencies: Diamond Harbour, Magrahat Paschim

Area
  - Total: 68.43 km^{2} (26.42 sq mi)

Population (2011)
  - Total: 156,166
  - Density: 2,282/km^{2} (5,911/sq mi)
  - Urban: 21,006

Demographics
  - Literacy: 75.72 per cent
  - Sex ratio: 957 ♂/♀

Languages
  - Official: Bengali
  - Additional official: English
- Time zone: UTC+05:30 (IST)
- Website: s24pgs.gov.in

Diamond Harbour I is a community development block that forms an administrative division in Diamond Harbour subdivision of South 24 Parganas district in the Indian state of West Bengal.

== Geography ==

The Diamond Harbour I CD block is located at 22°11′28″N 88°11′26″E. It has an average elevation of 8 metres (26 ft).

The Diamond Harbour I CD block is bounded by the Falta CD block in the north, the Magrahat I CD block in the east, the Kulpi CD block and the Sutahata CD block in the Purba Medinipur district, across the Hooghly, in the south, the Diamond Harbour II CD block in the west.

The South 24 Parganas district is divided into two distinct physiographic zones: the marine-riverine delta in the north and the marine delta zone in the south. As the sea receded southwards, in the sub-recent geological period, a large low-lying plain got exposed. Both tidal inflows and the rivers have been depositing sediments in this plain. The periodical collapse of both the natural levees and man-made embankments speed up the process of filling up of the depressions containing brackish water wetlands. The marine delta in the south is formed of interlacing tidal channels. As non-saline water for irrigation is scarce, agriculture is monsoon dominated. Some parts of the wetlands are still preserved for raising fish.

The Diamond Harbour I CD block has an area of 68.43 km^{2}. It has 1 panchayat samity, 8 gram panchayats, 110 gram sansads (village councils), 71 mouzas and 67 inhabited villages, as per the District Statistical Handbook, South Twenty-four Parganas. Patra village is located partly in Diamond Harbour I and partly in Diamond Harbour II CD Block. Diamond Harbour and Parulia Coastal police stations serve this CD Block. Headquarters of this CD block is at Diamond Harbour.

Gram panchayats of the Diamond Harbour I CD block/panchayat samiti are: Basuldanga, Bolsiddhi Kalinagar, Derak, Harindanga, Kanpur Dhanaberia, Mashat, Netra and Parulia.

== Demographics ==
=== Population ===
According to the 2011 Census of India, the Diamond Harbour I CD block had a total population of 156,166, of which 135,160 were rural and 21,006 were urban. There were 79,816 (51%) males and 76,350 (49%) females. Population below 6 years was 21,578. The Scheduled Castes numbered 29,098 (18.63%) and the Scheduled Tribes numbered 12 (0.01%).

According to the 2001 Census of India, the Diamond Harbour I CD block had a total population of 133,356, out of which 68,946 were males and 64,410 were females. The Diamond Harbour I CD block registered a population growth of 16.50 per cent during the 1991-2001 decade. Decadal growth for the South 24 Parganas district was 20.89 per cent. Decadal growth in West Bengal was 17.84 per cent. The Scheduled Castes at 27,932 formed around one-fourth the population. The Scheduled Tribes numbered 217.

Census Towns in the Diamond Harbour I CD block (2011 census figures in brackets): Masat (5,839), Sangrampur (5,669), Mohanpur (4,845) and Durganagar (4,658).

Large villages (with 4,000+ population) in the Diamond Harbour I CD block (2011 census figures in brackets): Darikrishnanagar (6,212), Joydebpur (4,370), Pancha Gansinghber (9,312) and Kamalpur (4,563).

Other villages in the Diamond Harbour I CD block include (2011 census figures in brackets): Parulia (1,825), Basuldanga (1,749), Bolsiddhi (3,119), Kanpur (2,467), Uttar Diarak (3,295) and Netra (3,577).

=== Literacy ===
According to the 2011 census, the total number of literate persons in the Diamond Harbour I CD block was 101,907 (75.72% of the population over 6 years) out of which males numbered 55,865 (81.12% of the male population over 6 years) and females numbered 46,042 (70.06% of the female population over 6 years). The gender disparity (the difference between female and male literacy rates) was 11.06%.

According to the 2011 Census of India, literacy in the South 24 Parganas district was 77.51 Literacy in West Bengal was 77.08% in 2011. Literacy in India in 2011 was 74.04%.

According to the 2001 Census of India, the Diamond Harbour I CD block had a total literacy of 67.13 per cent for the 6+ age group. While male literacy was 76.53 per cent female literacy was 56.93 per cent. South 24 Parganas district had a total literacy of 69.45 per cent, male literacy being 79.19 per cent and female literacy being 59.01 per cent.

See also – List of West Bengal districts ranked by literacy rate

Literacy in CD blocks of
South 24 Parganas district
Alipore Sadar subdivision
Bishnupur I – 78.33%
Bishnupur II – 81.37%
Budge Budge I – 80.57%
Budge Budge II – 79.13%
Thakurpukur Maheshtala – 83.54%
Baruipur subdivision
Baruipur – 76.46%
Bhangar I – 72.06%
Bhangar II – 74.49%
Jaynagar I – 73.17%
Jaynagar II – 69.71%
Kultali – 69.37%
Sonarpur – 79.70%
Canning subdivision
Basanti – 68.32%
Canning I – 70.76%
Canning II – 66.51%
Gosaba – 78.98%
Diamond Harbour subdivision
Diamond Harbour I – 75.72%
Diamond Harbour II – 76.91%
Falta – 77.17%
Kulpi – 75.49%
Magrahat I – 73.82%
Magrahat II – 77.41%
Mandirbazar – 75.89%
Mathurapur I – 73.93%
Mathurapur II – 77.77%
Kakdwip subdivision
Kakdwip – 77.93%
Namkhana – 85.72
Patharpratima – 82.11%
Sagar – 84.21%
Source: 2011 Census: CD Block Wise
Primary Census Abstract Data

=== Language ===
Languages of Diamond Harbour I CD block (2011)
1. Bengali (99.8%)
2. Hindi (0.14%)
3. Urdu (0.02%)
4. Others (0.01%)

At the time of the 2011 census, 99.83% of the population spoke Bengali, 0.14% Hindi and 0.02% Urdu as their first language.

=== Religion ===
Religion in Diamond Harbour I CD block (2011)
Islam	52.16%
Hinduism	47.72%
Other or not stated	0.12%

In the 2011 Census of India, Muslims numbered 81,453 and formed 52.16% of the population in the Diamond Harbour I CD block. Hindus numbered 74,519 and formed 47.72% of the population. Others numbered 194 and formed 0.12% of the population. In 2001, Hindus and Muslims were 51.89% and 48.05% of the population respectively.

The proportion of Hindus in the South Twenty-four Parganas district has declined from 76.0% in 1961 to 63.2% in 2011. The proportion of Muslims in the South Twenty-four Parganas district has increased from 23.4% to 35.6% during the same period. Christians formed 0.8% in 2011.

== Rural poverty ==
According to the Human Development Report for the South 24 Parganas district, published in 2009, in the Diamond Harbour I CD block the percentage of households below poverty line was 24.27%, a moderate level of poverty. In the north-east and mid central portion of the district, all CD blocks, with the exception of the Kulpi CD block, had poverty rates below 30%. As per the rural household survey in 2005, the proportion of households in the South 24 Parganas with poverty rates below poverty line was 34.11%, way above the state and national poverty ratios. The poverty rates were very high in the Sundarbans settlements with all the thirteen CD blocks registering poverty ratios above 30% and eight CD blocks had more than 40% of the population in the BPL category.

== Economy ==
=== Livelihood ===
Livelihood
in Diamond Harbour I CD block
1. Cultivators (6.87%)
2. Agricultural labourers (22.3%)
3. Household industries (7.22%)
4. Other Workers (63.6%)

In the Diamond Harbour I CD block in 2011, among the class of total workers, cultivators numbered 3,601 and formed 6.87%, agricultural labourers numbered 11,694 and formed 22.32%, household industry workers numbered 3,782 and formed 7.22% and other workers numbered 33,308 and formed 63.58%. Total workers numbered 52,385 and formed 33.54% of the total population, and non-workers numbered 103,781 and formed 66.46% of the population.

The District Human Development Report points out that in the blocks of the region situated in the close proximity of the Kolkata metropolis, overwhelming majority are involved in the non-agricultural sector for their livelihood. On the other hand, in the Sundarbans settlements, overwhelming majority are dependent on agriculture. In the intermediate region, there is again predominance of the non-agricultural sector. Though the region is not very close to Kolkata, many places are well connected and some industrial/ economic development has taken place.

Note: In the census records a person is considered a cultivator, if the person is engaged in cultivation/ supervision of land owned by self/government/institution. When a person who works on another person's land for wages in cash or kind or share, is regarded as an agricultural labourer. Household industry is defined as an industry conducted by one or more members of the family within the household or village, and one that does not qualify for registration as a factory under the Factories Act. Other workers are persons engaged in some economic activity other than cultivators, agricultural labourers and household workers. It includes factory, mining, plantation, transport and office workers, those engaged in business and commerce, teachers, entertainment artistes and so on.

=== Infrastructure ===
There are 67 inhabited villages in the Diamond Harbour I CD block, as per the District Census Handbook, South Twenty-four Parganas, 2011. 100% villages have power supply. 67 villages (100%) have drinking water supply. 14 villages (20.90%) have post offices. 60 villages (89.55%) have telephones (including landlines, public call offices and mobile phones). 36 villages (53.73%) have pucca (paved) approach roads and 25 villages (37.31%) have transport communication (includes bus service, rail facility and navigable waterways). 2 villages (2.99%) have agricultural credit societies and 3 villages (4.48%) have banks.

=== Agriculture ===
The South 24 Parganas had played a significant role in the Tebhaga movement launched by the Communist Party of India in 1946. Subsequently, Operation Barga was aimed at securing tenancy rights for the peasants. In Diamond Harbour I CD block 480.83 acres of land was acquired and vested. Out of this 211.67 acres or 44.01% of the vested land was distributed. The total number of patta (document) holders was 1,804.

According to the District Human Development Report agriculture is an important source of livelihood in the South Twentyfour Parganas district. The amount of cultivable land per agricultural worker is only 0.41 hectare in the district. Moreover, the irrigation facilities have not been extended to a satisfactory scale. Agriculture mostly remains a mono-cropped activity.

As per the District Census Handbook, the saline soil of the district is unfit for cultivation, but the non-salty lands are very fertile. While rice is the main food crop, jute is the main cash crop.

In 2013–14, there were 52 fertiliser depots, 12 seed stores and 37 fair price shops in the Diamond Harbour I CD block.

In 2013–14, the Diamond Harbour I CD block produced 6,819 tonnes of Aman paddy, the main winter crop, from 3,141 hectares, 1,398 tonnes of Aus paddy (summer crop) from 541 hectares, 7,562 tonnes of Boro paddy (spring crop) from 2,414 hectares, 796 tonnes of potatoes from 41 hectares. It also produced pulses and oilseeds.

=== Pisciculture ===
In Diamond Harbour I CD block, in 2013–14, the net area under effective pisciculture was 1,724 hectares, engaging 19,219 persons in the profession, and with an approximate annual production of 108,132 quintals.

Pisciculture is an important source of employment in the South 24 Parganas district. As of 2001, more than 4.5 lakh people were engaged in pisciculture. Out of this 2.57 lakhs were from the 13 blocks in the Sundarbans settlements.

=== Banking ===
In 2013–14, Diamond Harbour I CD block had offices of 11 commercial banks.

=== Backward Regions Grant Fund ===
The South 24 Parganas district is listed as a backward region and receives financial support from the Backward Regions Grant Fund. The fund, created by the Government of India, is designed to redress regional imbalances in development. As of 2012, 272 districts across the country were listed under this scheme. The list includes 11 districts of West Bengal.

== Transport ==
The Diamond Harbour I CD block has 1 ferry service and 10 originating/ terminating bus routes.

Netra, Basuldanga, Gurudas Nagar and Diamond Harbour are stations on the Sealdah South section.

== Education ==
In 2013–14, the Diamond Harbour I CD block had 81 primary schools with 7,938 students, 7 middle schools with 474 students, 6 high schools with 1,824 students and 12 higher secondary schools with 9,936 students. Diamond Harbour I CD block had 227 institutions for special and non-formal education with 10,635 students. Diamond Harbour municipal area (outside the CD blocks) had a general degree college with 5,213 students.

See also – Education in India

According to the 2011 census, in the Diamond Harbour I CD block, amongst the 67 inhabited villages, 4 villages did not have a school, 23 villages had two or more primary schools, 20 villages had at least 1 primary and 1 middle school and 16 villages had at least 1 middle and 1 secondary school.

== Healthcare ==
In 2014, the Diamond Harbour I CD block had 1 rural hospital, 2 primary health centres and 7 private nursing homes with total 86 beds and 16 doctors (excluding private bodies). It had 18 family welfare subcentres. 1,531 patients were treated indoor and 141,941 patients were treated outdoor in the hospitals, health centres and subcentres of the CD block.

According to the 2011 census, in the Diamond Harbour I CD block, 7 villages had community health centres, 2 villages had primary health centres, 25 villages had primary health subcentres, 3 villages had maternity and child welfare centres, 6 villages had medicine shops and out of the 67 inhabited villages 34 villages had no medical facilities.

Panchagram (Netra) Rural Hospital at PO Panchagram Singhi, with 30 beds, is the major government medical facility in the Diamond Harbour I CD block. There are primary health centres at Bardron (PO Hatuganj) (with 10 beds) and Raghunathpur (Masat) (with 6 beds).
