= Diamond Harbour subdivision =

Subdivision in West Bengal, India

Diamond Harbour
- Subdivision
- Location of Diamond Harbour subdivision in South 24 Parganas district
- Coordinates: 22.1910091°N 88.1904741°E
- Country: India
- State: West Bengal
- Division: Presidency
- District: South 24 Parganas
- Headquarters: Diamond Harbour

Government
  - CD Blocks: Falta, Magrahat I, Magrahat II, Diamond Harbour I, Diamond Harbour II, Mandirbazar, Mathurapur I, Mathurapur II, Kulpi
  - Lok Sabha constituencies: Jaynagar, Mathurapur, Diamond Harbour
  - Vidhan Sabha constituencies: Kulpi, Raidighi, Mandirbazar, Magrahat Purba, Magrahat Paschim, Diamond Harbour, Falta

Area
  - Total: 1,259.68 km^{2} (486.37 sq mi)

Population (2011)
  - Total: 2,125,758
  - Density: 1,687.54/km^{2} (4,370.70/sq mi)
  - Urban: 310,545

Demographics
  - Literacy: 76.26 per cent
  - Sex ratio: 951 ♂/♀

Languages
  - Official: Bengali
  - Additional official: English
- Time zone: UTC+05:30 (IST)
- Website: s24pgs.gov.in

Diamond Harbour subdivision is an administrative subdivision of South 24 Parganas district in the Indian state of West Bengal.

== Overview ==
Diamond Harbour subdivision is a rural subdivision with patches of urbanization. Only 14.61% of the population lives in the urban areas and an overwhelming 85.39% lives the rural areas. The entire district is situated in the Ganges Delta. The eastern part of the district is a flat plain area with small towns, many in clusters and the western part, located on the east bank of the Hooghly River, is covered by the Kulpi-Diamond Harbour Plain, which is 5–6 metres above sea level. Archaeological excavations at Deulpota and Harinarayanpur, on the bank of the Hooghly River indicate the existence of human habitation more than 2,000 years ago.

== Subdivisions ==

South 24 Parganas district is divided into five administrative subdivisions:

Subdivision	Headquarters	Area (km^{2})	Population (2011)	Urban population %	Rural Population %
Alipore Sadar	Alipore	427.43	1,490,342	59.85	40.15
Baruipur	Baruipur	1,355.44	2,396,643	31.05	68.95
Canning	Canning	1,103.73	1,140,562	12.37	87.63
Diamond Harbour	Diamond Harbour	1,264.68	2,125,758	14.61	85.39
Kakdwip	Kakdwip	1,389.93	1,008,653	0	100
South 24 Parganas	Alipore	9,960,00	8,161,961	25.58	74.42

26.04% of the total population of South 24 Parganas district live in Diamond Harbourr subdivision.

== Administrative units ==
Diamond Harbour subdivision has 11 police stations, 9 community development blocks, 9 panchayat samitis, 99 gram panchayats, 890 mouzas, 839 inhabited villages, 1 municipality and 35 census towns. The municipality is at Diamond Harbour. The census towns are: Ajodhyanagar, Sirakol, Uttar Bishnupur, Ghola Noapara, Usthi, Barijpur, Uttar Kusum, Kalikapota, Bamna, Dhamua, Shyampur, Nainan, Uttar Kalas, Dihi Kalas, Swangrampur, Bilandapur, Magrahat, Chandpur (M), Bangsidharpur (M), Purba Bishnupur, Berandari Bagaria, Dhola, Hasimnagar, Baneshwarpur, Chandpala Anantapathpur, Fatepur, Masat, Sangrampur, Mohanpur, Durganagar, Patdaha, Krishna Chandrapur, Mathurapur, Purba Ranaghat, Lalpur,

== Police stations ==
Police stations in Diamond Harbour subdivision have the following features and jurisdiction:

Police Station	Area covered (km^{2})	Border (km)	Municipal town/ city	CD Block
Falta	130.68	-	-	Falta
Magrahat	136.93	-	-	Magrahat II
Usthi	119.04	-	-	Magrahat I
Diamond Harbour	n/a	-	Diamond Harbour	Diamond Harbour I, Diamond Harbour II
Diamond Harbour Women	n/a	-	Diamond Harbour	Diamond Harbour I
Ramnagar	n/a	-	-	Diamond Harbour II
Parulia Coastal	n/a	-	-	Diamond Harbour I, Diamond Harbour II
Mandirbazar	118.07	-	-	Mandirbazar
Mathurapur	115	-	-	Mathurapur I
Raidighi	227.45	-	-	Mathurapur II
Kulpi	166.63	-	-	Kulpi
Dholahat	312.67	-	-	Kulpi, Mathurapur I, Kakdwip, Patharpratima

== CD Blocks ==

Community development blocks in Diamond Harbour subdivision are:

CD Block	Headquarters	Area (km^{2})	Population (2011)	SC %	ST %	Hindus %	Muslims %	Literacy rate %	Census Towns
Falta	Harindanga	130.68	249,561	24.15	0.03	64.86	35.00	77.17	4
Magrahat I	Usthi	119.04	269,494	20.48	0.08	40.44	57.78	77.41	9
Magrahat II	Magrahat	136.93	304,744	34.61	0.05	48.60	50.01	77.41	8
Diamond Harbour I	Diamond Harbour	68.43	135,160	18.63	0.01	47.72	52.16	75.72	4
Diamond Harbour II	Sarisha	95.59	190,801	26.55	0.04	59.77	39.68	76.91	1
Mandirbazar	Mandirbazar	118.07	214,040	42.49	0.01	62.03	37.65	75.89	3
Mathurapur I	Mathurapur	147.3	169,263	35.18	0.25	59.44	40.41	73.93	4
Mathurapur II	Baribhanga Abad	227.45	280,839	28.23	2.10	82.08	15.37	77.77	-
Kulpi	Kulpi	210.83	283,197	29.67	0.11	58.87	40.60	75.49	2

== Gram panchayats ==
The subdivision contains 99 gram panchayats under 9 community development blocks:

- Falta CD block consists of 13 gram panchayats: Banganagar-I, Banganagar-II, Belsingha-I, Belsingha-II, Chaluari, Debipur, Falta, Fatepur, Gopalpur, Harindanga-I, Harindanga-II, Mallikpur and Noyapukuria.
- Magrahat I CD block consists of 11 gram panchayats: Ektara, Hariharpur, Kalikapota, Lakshmikantapur, Rangilbad, Sherpur, Shrichanda, Sirakol, Usthi, Uttarkusum and Yearpur.
- Magrahat II CD block consists of 14 gram panchayats: Amratala, Dhamua Dakshin, Dhamua Uttar, Dhanpota, Dihikalas, Gokarni, Hotor Morjada, Jugdia, Magrahat Paschim, Magrahat Purba, Mohanpur, Multi, Nainan and Urelchandpur.
- Diamond Harbour I CD block consists of eight gram panchayats: Basuldanga, Bolsiddhi Kalinagar, Derak, Harindanga, Kanpur Dhanaberia, Mashat, Netra and Parulia.
- Diamond Harbour II CD block consists of eight gram panchayats: Bhadura Haridas, Kalatalahat, Kamarpole, Khorda, Mathur, Nurpur, Patra and Sarisa.
- Mandirbazar CD block consists of ten gram panchayats: Anchana, Chandpur, Dakshin Bishnupur, Dhanurhat, Gabberia, Ghateswar, Jagadishpur, Kecharkur, Krishnapur and Nisapur.
- Mathurapur I CD block consists of ten gram panchayats: Abad Bhagawanpur, Dakshin Lakshminarayanpur, Debipur, Krishnachandrapur, Lalpur, Mathurapur Paschim, Mathurapur Purba, Nalua, Shankarpur and Uttar Lakshminarayanpur.
- Mathurapur II CD block consists of 11 gram panchayats: Dighirpar Bakultala, Gilarchhat, Kankandighi, Kasinagar, Kautala, Khari, Kumrapara, Nagendrapur, Nandakumarpur, Radhakantapur and Raidighi.
- Kulpi CD block consists of 14 gram panchayats: Baburmahal, Belpukur, Chandipur, Dhola, Gajipur, Iswaripur, Kamarchak, Karanjali, Keoratala, Kulpi, Rajarampur, Ramkishore, Ramkrishnapur and Ramnagar Gazipur.

== Municipal towns/ cities ==
An overview of the only municipal town in Diamond Harbour subdivision is given below:

Municipal town/ city	Area (km^{2})	Population (2011)	SC %	ST %	Hindus %	Muslims %	Literacy rate %
Diamond Harbour	10.36	41,802	12.49	0.17	85.98	13.75	85.93

== Education ==
South 24 Parganas district had a literacy rate of 77.51% as per the provisional figures of the census of India 2011. Alipore Sadar subdivision had a literacy rate of 81.14%, Baruipur subdivision 77.45%, Canning subdivision 70.98%, Diamond Harbour subdivision 76.26% and Kakdwip subdivision 82.04%

Given in the table below is a comprehensive picture of the education scenario in South 24 Parganas district, with data for the year 2013-14:

Subdivision	Primary School		Middle School		High School		Higher Secondary School		General College, Univ		Technical / Professional Instt		Non-formal Education	
Subdivision	Institution	Student	Institution	Student	Institution	Student	Institution	Student	Institution	Student	Institution	Student	Institution	Student
Alipore Sadar	531	53,719	34	4,455	50	16,471	91	66,813	5	8,122	6	3,094	1,379	53,429
Baruipur	883	132,649	65	8,954	50	26,443	128	129,195	8	27,657	7	6,735	3,116	138,507
Canning	532	81,697	59	9,181	29	10,515	55	57,921	4	5,490	1	n/a	2,105	96,622
Diamond Harbour	1,212	116,407	61	6,680	98	38,470	145	113,147	7	20,061	5	1,774	3,140	137,378
Kakdwip	598	53,058	45	5,654	48	20,383	82	56,192	3	5,420	1	100	1,844	78,897
South 24 Parganas district*	3,756	437,530	264	34,924	275	118,282	501	423,268	27	66,750	20	11,703	11,584	504,833

.* Does not include data for portions of South 24 Parganas district functioning under Kolkata Municipal Corporation

The following institutions are located in Diamond Harbour subdivision:

- Diamond Harbour Women's University was established at Sarisha in 2013.
- Neotia Institute of Technology Management and Science was established at PO Amira in 2002.
- Shishuram Das College was established at Bhushna, Kamarzole in 2010,
- Fakir Chand College was established at Diamond Harbour in 1948. It is the oldest college in the district.
- Diamond Harbour Government Medical College and Hospital was established at Diamond Harbour in 2019.
- Shirakole Mahavidyalaya was established in 2007 at Sirakol.
- Sadhan Chandra Mahavidyalaya was established at Harindanga in 2007.
- Dhola Mahavidyalaya was established at Dhola in 2009.
- Raidighi College was established at Raidighi in 1995.
- L.J.D. College was established at Punya, PO Saharahat, in 2015.
- Magrahat College was established at Magrahat in 1996.

== Healthcare ==
The table below (all data in numbers) presents an overview of the medical facilities available and patients treated in the hospitals, health centres and sub-centres in 2014 in South 24 Parganas district.

Subdivision	Health & Family Welfare Deptt, WB				Other State Govt Deptts	Local bodies	Central Govt Deptts / PSUs	NGO / Private Nursing Homes	Total	Total Number of Beds	Total Number of Doctors	Indoor Patients	Outdoor Patients
Subdivision	Hospitals	Rural Hospitals	Block Primary Health Centres	Primary Health Centres	Other State Govt Deptts	Local bodies	Central Govt Deptts / PSUs	NGO / Private Nursing Homes	Total	Total Number of Beds	Total Number of Doctors	Indoor Patients	Outdoor Patients
Alipore Sadar	-	3	3	7	1	3	-	48	65	1,159	199	33,498	633,233
Baruipur	1	6	1	18	-	2	-	66	94	1,045	201	48,114	1,266,244
Canning	1	3	1	6	-	-	-	15	26	351	49	22,467	666,377
Diamond Harbour	1	6	3	17	-	-	-	68	95	1077	169	65,051	1,325,535
Kakdwip	1	3	1	11	-	-	-	20	36	458	73	28,707	405,501
South 24 Parganas district	4	21	9	59	1	5	-	217	316	4,090	691	197,837	4,397,890

Note: The district data does not include data for portions of South 24 Parganas district functioning under Kolkata Municipal Corporation. The number of doctors exclude private bodies.

Medical facilities in Diamond Harbour subdivision are as follows:

Hospitals: (Name, location, beds)

- Diamond Harbour Subdivisional Hospital, Diamond Harbour, 250 beds

Rural Hospitals: (Name, CD block, location, beds)

- Mathurapur Rural Hospital, Mathurapur I CD block, Mathurapur, 60 beds
- Raidighi Rural Hospital, Mathurapur II CD block, Raidighi, 60 beds
- Baneswarpur Rural Hospital, Magrahat I CD block, Baneswarpur, 30 beds
- Magrahat Rural Hospital, Magrahat II CD block, Magrahat, 30 beds
- Panchagram (Netra) Rural Hospital, Diamond Harbour I CD block, PO Panchagram Singhi, 30 beds
- Naiyarat Rural Hospital, Mandirbazar CD block, Naiyarat, 30 beds

Block Primary Health Centres: (Name, CD block, location, beds)

- Falta Block Primary Health Centre, Falta CD block, Falta, 10 beds
- Sarisha Block Primary Health Centre, Diamond Harbour II CD block, Sarisha, 15 beds
- Kulpi Block Primary Health Centre, Kulpi CD block, Kulpi, 15 beds

Primary Health Centres: (CD block-wise)(CD block, PHC location, beds)

- Falta CD block: Dholtikuri (PO Charberia) (6)
- Magrahat I CD block: Sirakol (6)
- Magrahat II CD block: Mohanpu (6), Gokarni (6)
- Diamond Harbour I CD block: Bardron (PO Hatuganj) (10), Raghunathpur (Masat) (6)
- Diamond Harbour II CD block: Gandia Raghunathpur (6), Paschim Bhabanipur (PO Mukundapur) (6)
- Mathurapur I CD block: Jadavpur (6), Ghatbakultala (10)
- Mathurapur II CD block: Purandarpur (PO Pukurhat (6), Baribhanga Abad (6), Gilerchat (6)
- Kulpi CD block: Dakshin Jagadishpur (6), Belpukur (10), Ramkishorepur (6), Jamtalhat (6)

== Electoral constituencies ==
Lok Sabha (parliamentary) and Vidhan Sabha (state assembly) constituencies in Diamond Harbour subdivision were as follows:

Lok Sabha constituency	Reservation	Vidhan Sabha constituency	Reservation	CD Block and/or Gram panchayats and/or municipal areas
Mathurapur	Reserved for SC	Kulpi	None	Kulpi CD Block
		Raidighi	None	Mathurapur II CD Block, and Abad Bhagawanpur, Debipur, Krishnachandrapur, Lalpur, Nalua and Shankarpur gram panchayats of Mathurapur I CD Block
		Mandirbazar	Reserved for SC	Mandirbazar CD Block, and Dakshin Lakshminarayanpur, Mathurapur Paschim, Mathurapur Purba and Uttar Lakshminarayanpur gram panchayats of Mathurapur I CD Block
		Magrahat Paschim	None	Magrahat I CD Block, and Netra gram panchayat of Diamond Harbour I CD Block
Jaynagar	Reserved for SC	Magrahat Purba	Reserved for SC	Magrahat II CD Block
Diamond Harbour	None	Diamond Harbour	None	Basuldanga, Bolsiddhi Kalinagar, Derak, Harindanga, Kanpur Dhanaberia, Mashat and Parulia gram panchayats of Diamond Harbour I CD Block, Kamarpole, Khorda, Mathur, Nurpur, Patra and Sarisa gram panchayats of Diamond Harbour II CD Block, and Diamond Harbour municipality
		Falta	None	Falta CD Block, and Bhadura Haridas and Kalatalahat gram panchayats of Diamond Harbour II CD Block
