= Netra, Diamond Harbour =

Netra
- Village
- Location in West Bengal Location in India
- Coordinates: 22.2128°N 88.2595°E
- Country: India
- State: West Bengal
- District: South 24 Parganas
- CD block: Diamond Harbour I

Area
  - Total: 1.11 km^{2} (0.43 sq mi)
- Elevation: 8 m (26 ft)

Population (2011)
  - Total: 3,577
  - Density: 3,220/km^{2} (8,350/sq mi)

Languages
  - Official: Bengali
  - Additional official: English
- Time zone: UTC+5:30 (IST)
- PIN: 743375
- Telephone code: +91 3174
- Vehicle registration: WB-19 to WB-22, WB-95 to WB-99
- Lok Sabha constituency: Mathurapur (SC)
- Vidhan Sabha constituency: Magrahat Paschim
- Website: www.s24pgs.gov.in

Netra is a village and a gram panchayat within the jurisdiction of the Diamond Harbour police station in the Diamond Harbour I CD block in the Diamond Harbour subdivision of the South 24 Parganas district in the Indian state of West Bengal.

== Geography ==
Cities and towns in the western part of Diamond Harbour subdivision (including Falta, Diamond Harbour I & II, Kulpi CD blocks) in South 24 Parganas district
M: municipal city/ town, CT: census town, R: rural/ urban centre, N: neighbourhood, H: historical place/ religious centre
Owing to space constraints in the small map, the actual locations in a larger map may vary slightly

=== Area overview ===
Diamond Harbour subdivision is a rural subdivision with patches of urbanization. Only 14.61% of the population lives in the urban areas and an overwhelming 85.39% lives in the rural areas. In the western portion of the subdivision (shown in the map alongside) there are 11 census towns. The entire district is situated in the Ganges Delta and the western part, located on the east bank of the Hooghly River, is covered by the Kulpi Diamond Harbour Plain, which is 5–6 metres above sea level. Archaeological excavations at Deulpota and Harinarayanpur, on the bank of the Hooghly River indicate the existence of human habitation more than 2,000 years ago.

Note: The map alongside presents some of the notable locations in the subdivision. All places marked in the map are linked in the larger full screen map.

=== Location ===
Netra is located at 22°12′46″N 88°15′34″E. It has an average elevation of 8 metres (26 ft).

== Demographics ==
According to the 2011 Census of India, Netra had a total population of 3,577 of which 1,864 (52%) were males and 1,713 (48%) were females. There were 483 persons in the age range of 0–6 years. The total number of literate persons in Netra was 2,381 (76.96% of the population over 6 years).

== Transport ==
Netra is on the Usthi-Diamond Harbour Road.

Netra railway station is on the Sealdah–Diamond Harbour line of the Kolkata Suburban Railway system.

=== Commuters ===
With the electrification of the railways, suburban traffic has grown tremendously since the 1960s. As of 2005-06, more than 1.7 million (17 lakhs) commuters use the Kolkata Suburban Railway system daily. After the partition of India, refugees from East Pakistan/ Bangladesh had a strong impact on the development of urban areas in the periphery of Kolkata. The new immigrants depended on Kolkata for their livelihood, thus increasing the number of commuters. Eastern Railway runs 1,272 EMU trains daily.

== Education ==
Netra High Madrasah is a Bengali-medium coeducational institution established in 1926. It has facilities for teaching from class V to Class XII.

Netra High School is a Bengali-medium coeducational institution established in 1930. It has facilities for teaching from class V to class XII.

== Healthcare ==
Panchagram (Netra) Rural Hospital at PO Panchagram Singhi, with 30 beds, is the major government medical facility in the Diamond Harbour I CD block.
