= South 24 Parganas =

District in West Bengal, India

South 24 Parganas district Dokkhin Chobbish Pôrgônā Jelā (Bengali)
- District of West Bengal
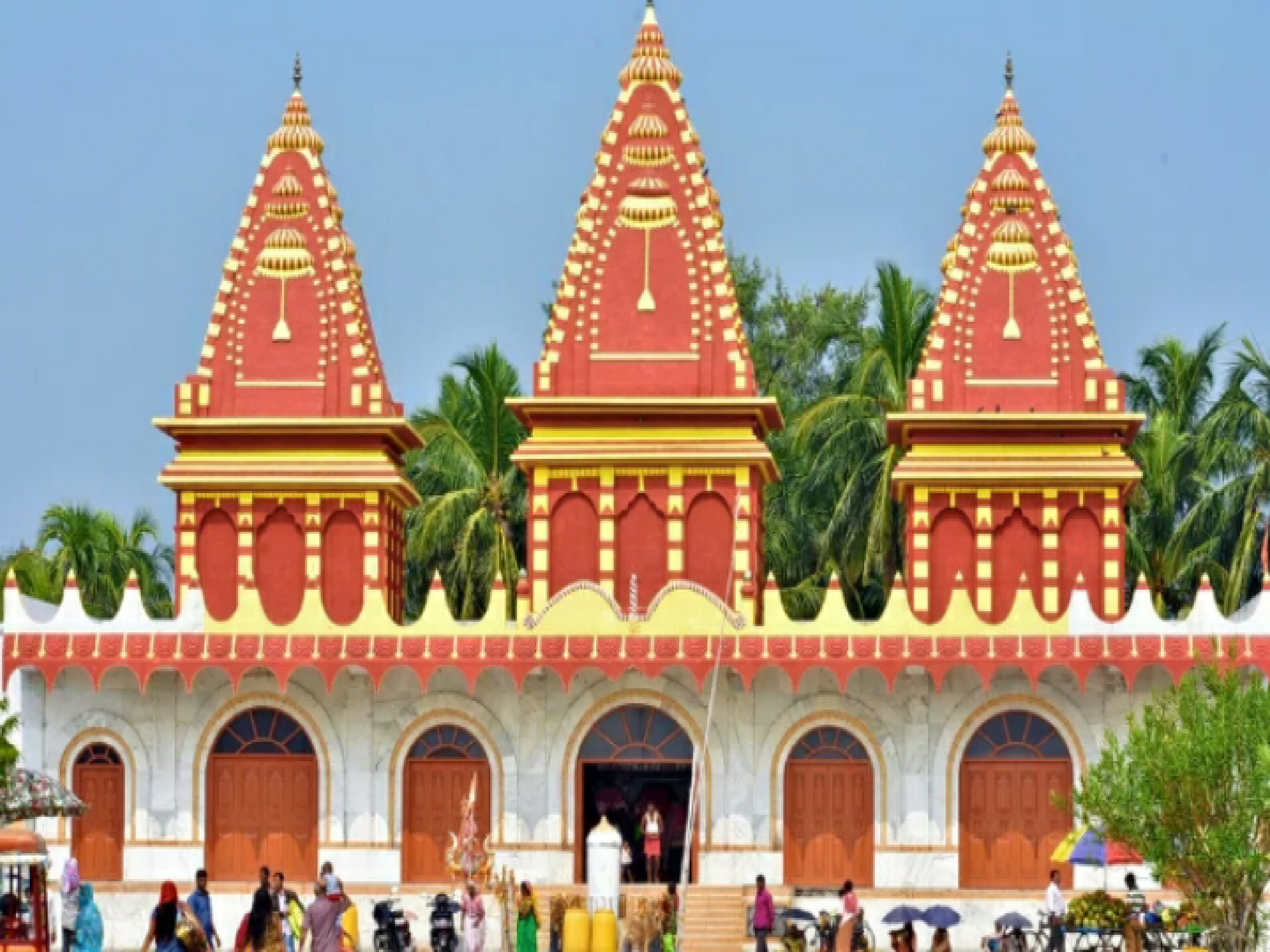
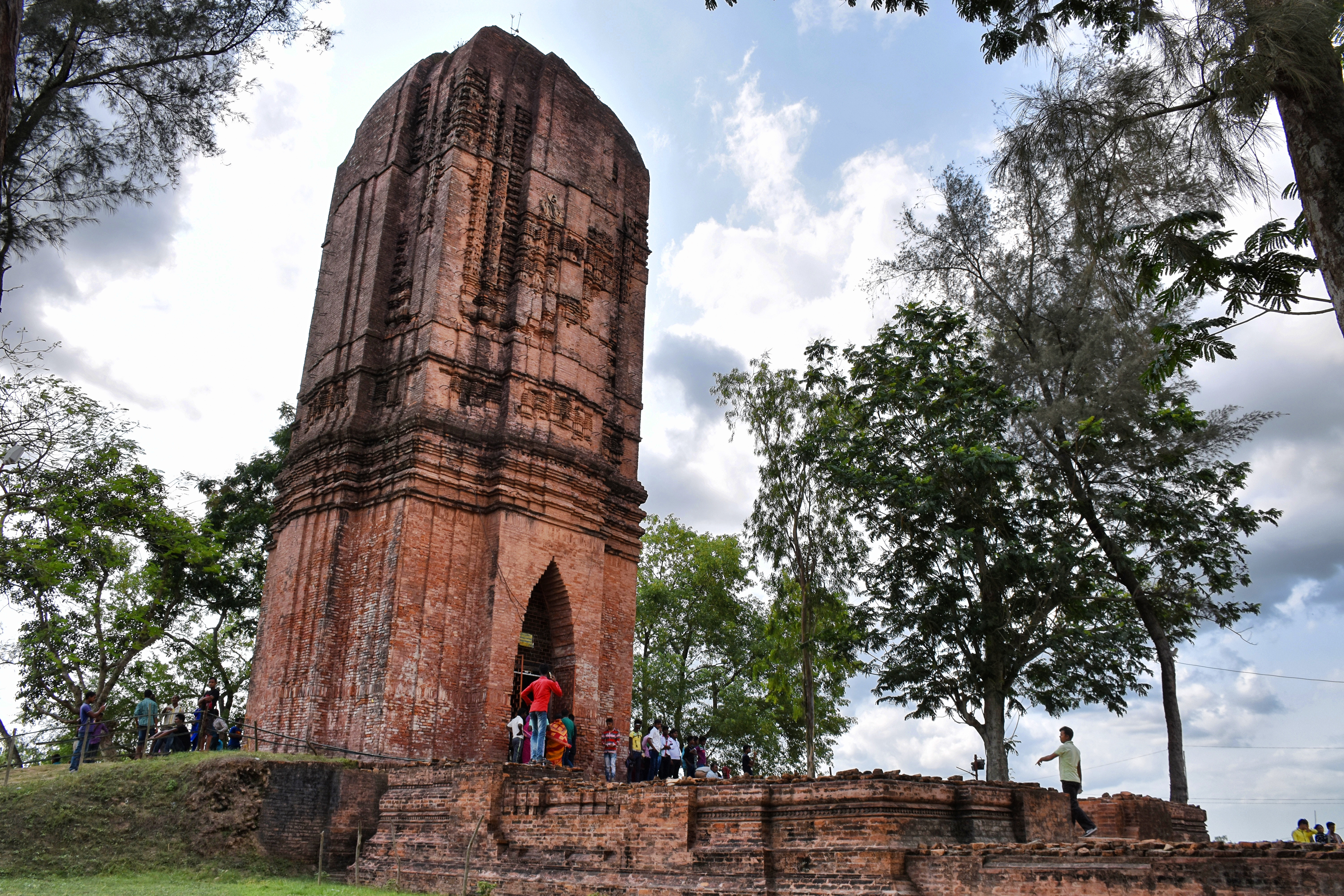
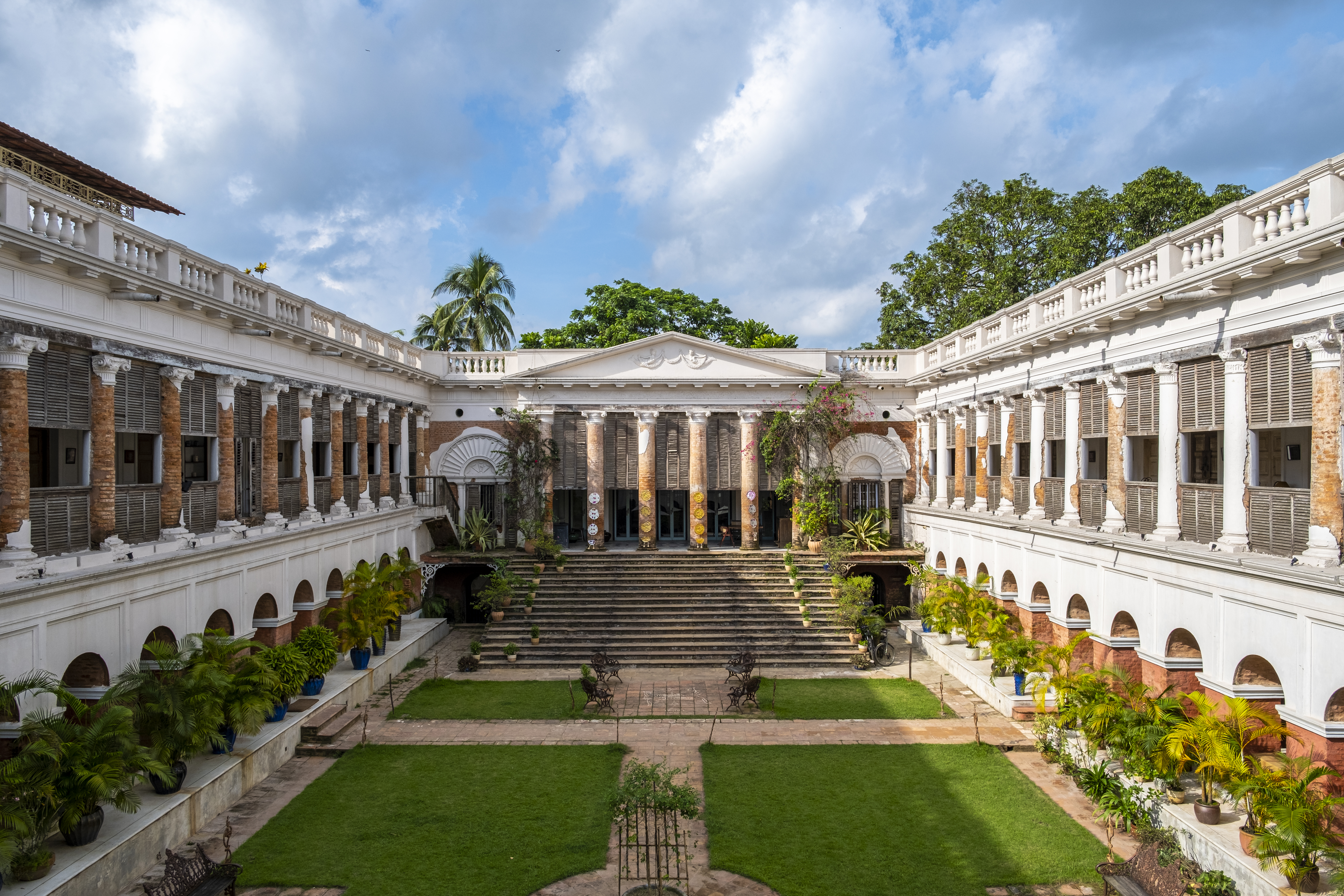
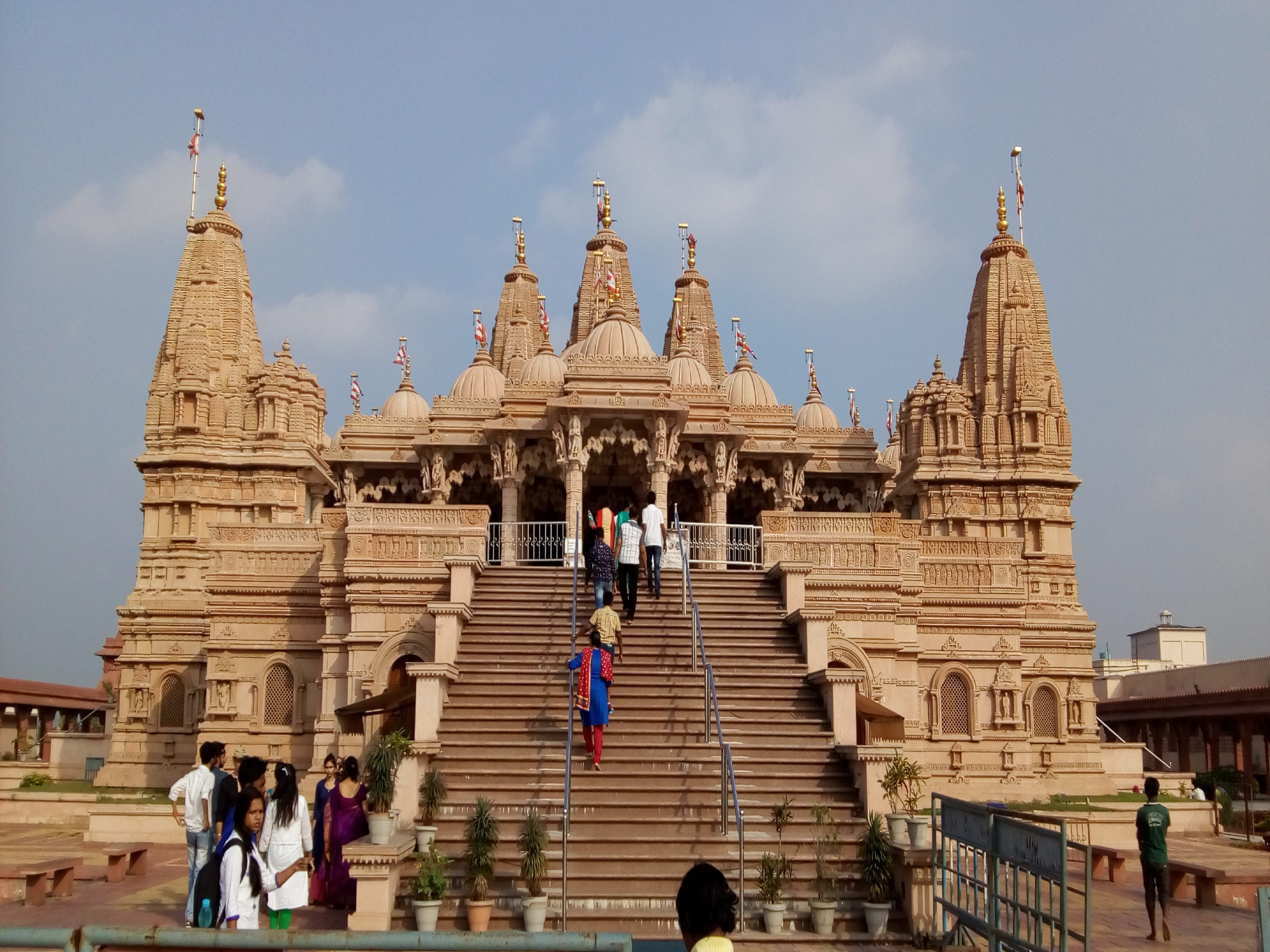
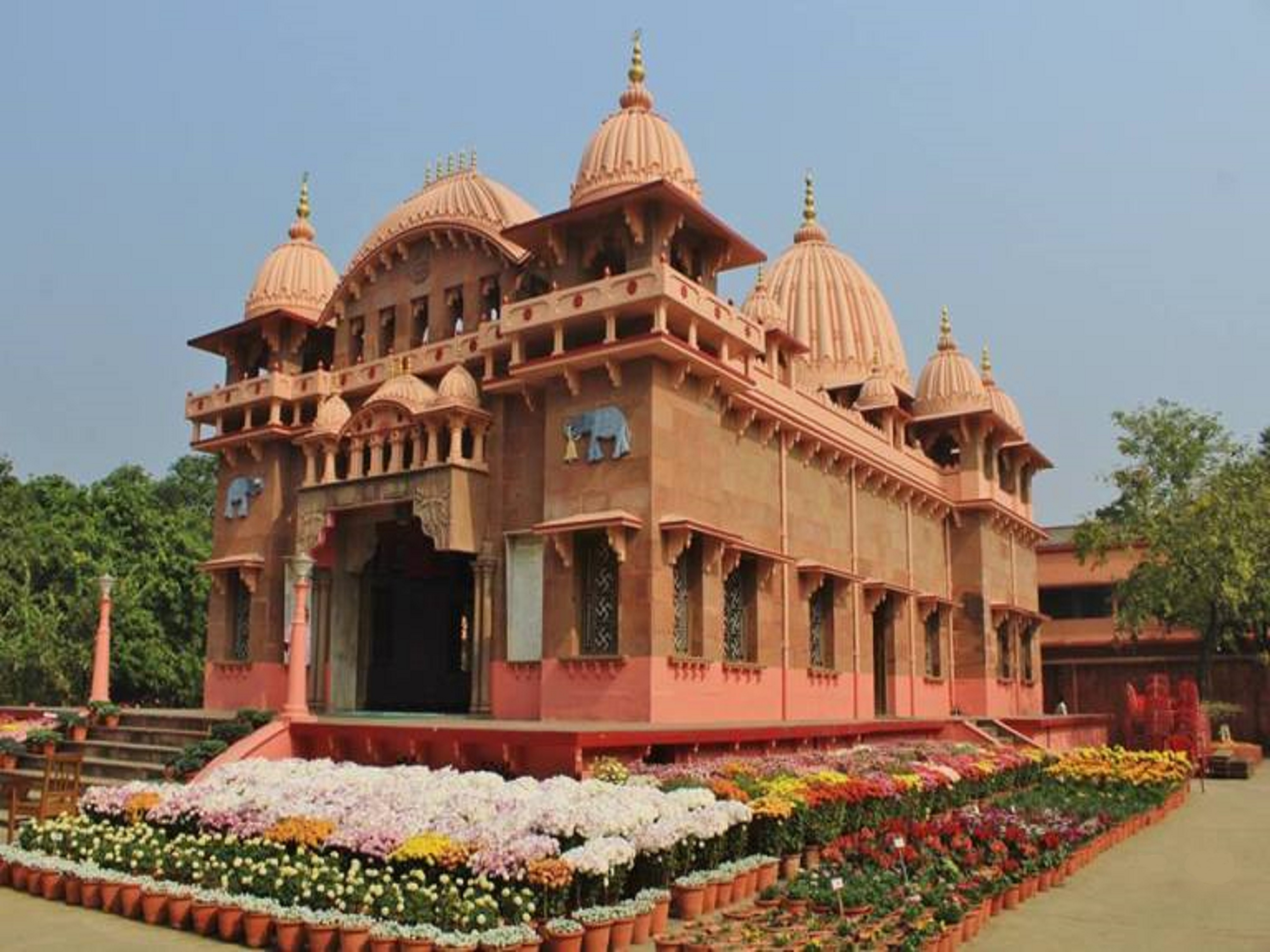
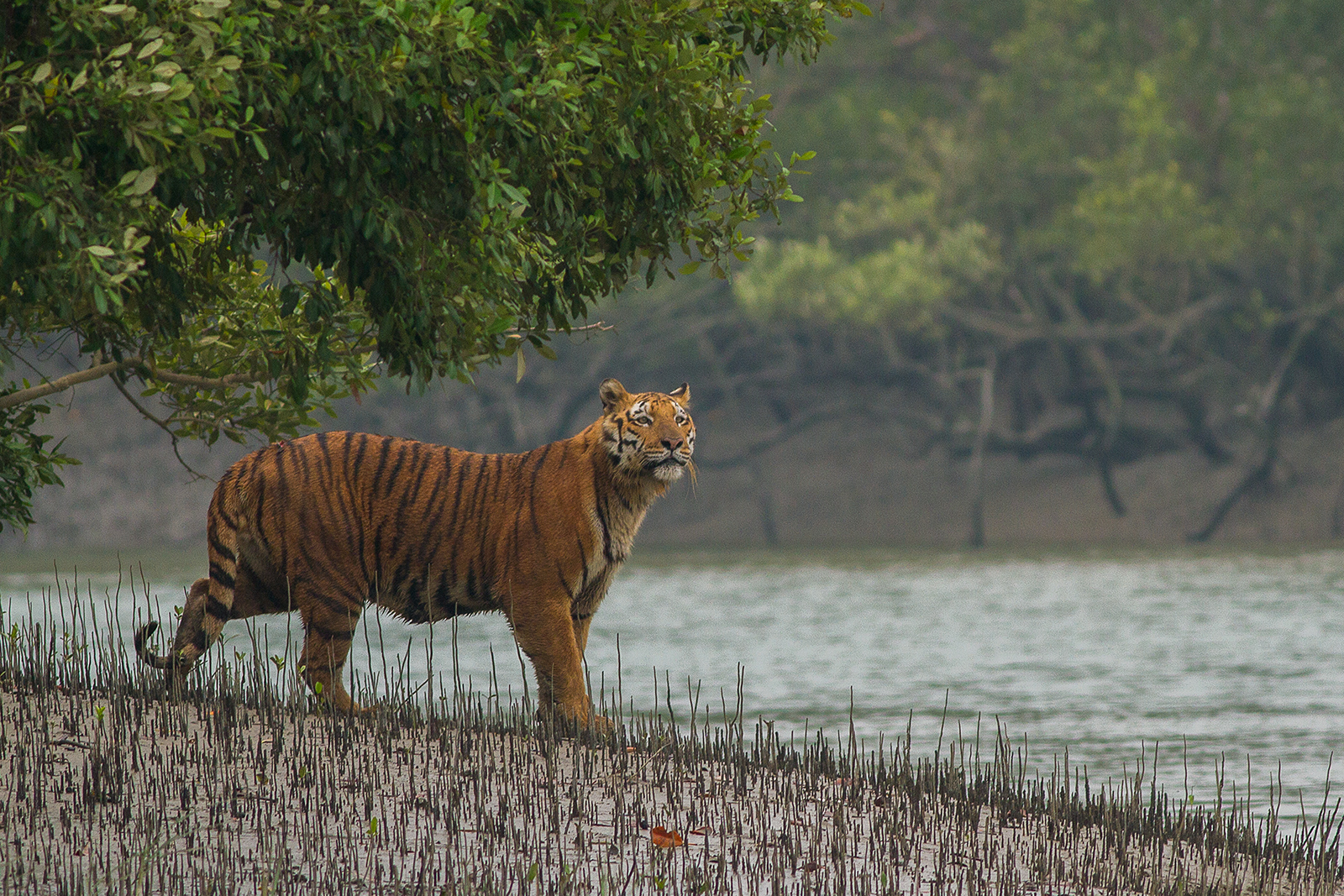
- Clockwise from top: Gangasagar Kapilmuni Temple, Bawali Rajbari, Nimpith Ramkrishna Mission Ashram, Royal Bengal Tiger in the Sundarbans, BAPS Shri Swaminarayan Temple in Pailan, Jatar Deul
- Interactive Map Outlining South 24 Parganas District
- Location of South 24 Parganas district in West Bengal
- Coordinates: 22.1815262°N 88.53780484°E
- Country: India
- State: West Bengal
- Division: Presidency
- Headquarters: Alipore

Government
  - Subdivisions: Alipore Sadar, Baruipur, Canning, Diamond Harbour, Kakdwip
  - CD Blocks: Thakurpukur Maheshtala, Budge Budge I, Budge Budge II, Bishnupur I, Bishnupur II, Bhangar I, Bhangar II, Sonarpur, Baruipur, Jaynagar I, Jaynagar II, Kultali, Canning I, Canning II, Basanti, Gosaba, Falta, Magrahat I, Magrahat II, Diamond Harbour I, Diamond Harbour II, Mandirbazar, Mathurapur I, Mathurapur II, Kulpi, Kakdwip, Namkhana, Patharpratima, Sagar
  - Lok Sabha constituencies: Jaynagar, Mathurapur, Diamond Harbour, Jadavpur, Kolkata Dakshin
  - Vidhan Sabha constituencies: Gosaba, Basanti, Kultali, Patharpratima, Kakdwip, Sagar, Kulpi, Raidighi, Mandirbazar, Jaynagar, Baruipur Purba, Canning Paschim, Canning Purba, Baruipur Paschim, Magrahat Purba, Magrahat Paschim, Diamond Harbour, Falta, Satgachia, Bishnupur, Sonarpur Dakshin, Bhangar, Kasba, Jadavpur, Sonarpur Uttar, Tollyganj, Behala Purba, Behala Paschim, Maheshtala, Budge Budge, Metiaburuz

Area
  - Total: 9,960 km^{2} (3,850 sq mi)

Population (2011)
  - Total: 8,161,961
  - Density: 819/km^{2} (2,120/sq mi)
  - Urban: 2,087,773

Demographics
  - Literacy: 77.51 per cent
  - Sex ratio: 956 ♂/♀

Languages
  - Official: Bengali
  - Additional official: English
- Time zone: UTC+05:30 (IST)
- Website: www.s24pgs.gov.in

South 24 Parganas (abbr. 24 PGS (S)), or sometimes South Twenty Four Parganas and Dakshin 24 Parganas, is a district in the Indian state of West Bengal, headquartered in Alipore, with its Zilla Parishad in Baruipur. It is the largest district of West Bengal by area and second largest by population. It is the sixth most populous district in India (out of 640). On one side of the district there is the urban fringe of Kolkata, and on the other the remote riverine villages in the Sundarbans.

== History ==
Originally, the capital of Raja Bikramaditya and Maharaja Pratapaditya was at Dhumghat. Later it was transferred to Ishwaripur (Originated from the name Jeshoreshwaripur). Maharaja Pratapaditya declared the independence of South Bengal from the Mughal Empire.

Pratapaditya's father Shrihari (Shridhar), a Kayastha, was an influential officer in the service of Daud Khan Karrani. Upon the fall of Daud, he fled with the government treasure in his custody. He then, in 1574, set up a kingdom for himself in the marshy land to the extreme south of Khulna district and took the title of Maharaja. Pratapaditya inherited the kingship in 1574. The Baharistan and travel diary of Abdul Latif, and the contemporary European writers, testify to Pratapaditya's personal ability, political pre-eminence, material resources and martial strength, particularly in war-boats. His territories covered the greater part of what is now included in the greater Jessore, Khulna and Barisal districts. He established his capital at Dhumghat, a strategic position at the confluence of the Jamuna and Ichhamati rivers.

Among the Bengal zamindars, Pratapaditya was the first to send his envoy to Islam Khan Chisti with a large gift to win the favour of the Mughals, and then, in 1609, tendered personal submission to the Subahdar. He promised military assistance and personal service in the Mughal campaign against Musa Khan, a pledge he did not keep. To punish Pratapaditya for his disloyalty and to subjugate his territory, a large expedition was launched under the command of Ghiyas Khan, which soon reached Salka, near the confluence of the Jamuna and Ichhamati, in 1611. Pratapaditya equipped a strong army and fleet and placed them under expert officers. His eldest son Udayaditya constructed an almost impregnable fort at Salka with natural barriers on three sides. In battle, the Jessore fleet gained an initial advantage but the imperial army cut off the Jessore fleet, made a breach in its ranks and broke its unity and discipline. In the melee that followed, the admiral, Khwaja Kamal, was killed. Udayaditya lost heart and hastily fled to his father, narrowly escaping capture.

Pratapaditya prepared himself to fight a second time from a new base near the confluence of the Kagarghat canal and the Jamuna river. He constructed a fort and gathered all his available forces there. The imperialists began the battle on January, 1612 with an attack on the Jessore fleet, compelling it to seek shelter beneath the fort. But their advance was checked by the heavy cannonade of the Jessore artillery. However, a sudden attack by the imperialists completely defeated the Jessore fleet and they fell upon the fort with elephants in front, compelling Pratapaditya to evacuate the fort and retreat.

This second defeat sealed the fate of Pratapaditya. At Kagarghat he tendered submission to Ghiyas Khan, who personally escorted Pratapaditya to Islam Khan at Dhaka. The Jessore king was put in chains and his kingdom was annexed. Pratapaditya was kept confined at Dhaka. No authentic information is available regarding his last days, however, he probably died as a prisoner at Benares, on his way to Delhi.

== Administration ==
The district comprises five subdivisions: Alipore Sadar, Baruipur, Canning, Diamond Harbour and Kakdwip.

Alipore is the district headquarters. There are 33 police stations, 29 community development blocks, 7 municipalities and 312 gram panchayats in the district.

Other than the municipality areas, each subdivision contains community development blocks which in turn are divided into rural areas and census towns. In total there are 118 urban units: 7 municipalities and 111 census towns.

=== Alipore Sadar Subdivision ===
The Alipore Sadar subdivision consists of:

- Three municipalities: Maheshtala, Budge Budge and Pujali.
- Thakurpukur Maheshtala, a community development block consisting of rural areas with six gram panchayats and nine census towns: Joka, Chata Kalikapur, Ganye Gangadharpur, Rameswarpur, Asuti, Hanspukuria, Kalua, Ramchandrapur and Samali.
- Budge Budge I, a community development block consisting of rural areas with six gram panchayats and seven census towns: Uttar Raypur, Balarampur, Buita, Benjanhari Acharial (P), Abhirampur, Nischintapur and Birlapur.
- Budge Budge II, a community development block consisting of rural areas with eleven gram panchayats and five census towns: Chak Kashipur, Chak Alampur, Bowali, Dakshin Raypur and Poali.
- Bishnupur I, a community development block consisting of rural areas with eleven gram panchayats and four census towns: Daulatpur, Bhasa, Bishnupur and Kanyanagar.
- Bishnupur II, a community development block consisting of rural areas with eleven gram panchayats and eleven census towns: Nahazari, Nadabhanga, Kanganbaria, Bora Gagangohalia, Chanddandaha, Barkalikapur, Patharberia, Ramkrishnapur, Amtala, Kriparampur and Chak Enayetnagar.

=== Baruipur Subdivision ===
The Baruipur subdivision consists of:

- Three municipalities: Rajpur Sonarpur, Baruipur and Jaynagar Majilpur.
- Bhangar I, a community development block consisting of rural areas with nine gram panchayats and three census towns: Maricha, Bhangar Raghunathpur and Gobindapur.
- Bhangar II, a community development block consisting of rural areas with only ten gram panchayats.
- Sonarpur, a community development block consisting of rural areas with eleven gram panchayats and seven census towns: Radhanagar, Danga, Ramchandrapur, Bidyadharpur, Kalikapur, Chak Baria and Sahebpur.
- Baruipur, a community development block consisting of rural areas with nineteen gram panchayats and twelve census towns: Petua, Garia, Panchghara, Mallikpur, Hariharpur, Champahati, Solgohalia, Naridana, Baruipur (P), Salipur (P), Khodar Bazar and Komarhat.
- Jaynagar I, a community development block consisting of rural areas with twelve gram panchayats and six census towns: Raynagar, Kalikapur Barasat, Baharu, Uttarparanij, Alipur and Uttar Durgapur.
- Jaynagar II, a community development block consisting of rural areas with ten gram panchayats and two census towns: Nimpith and Tulshighata.
- Kultali, a community development block consisting of rural areas with only nine gram panchayats.

=== Canning Subdivision ===
The Canning subdivision consists of:

- Canning I, a community development block consisting of rural areas with ten gram panchayats and eight census towns: Kalaria, Gaur Daha, Banshra, Rajapur, Taldi, Bayarsing, Matla and Dighirpar.
- Canning II, a community development block consisting of rural areas with nine gram panchayats and one census town: Makhal Tala.
- Basanti, a community development block consisting of rural areas with thirteen gram panchayats and one census town: Basanti.
- Gosaba, a community development block consisting of rural areas with only fourteen gram panchayats.

=== Diamond Harbour Subdivision ===
The Diamond Harbour subdivision consists of:

- One municipality: Diamond Harbour
- Falta, a community development block consisting of rural areas with thirteen gram panchayats and four census towns: Hasimnagar, Baneshwarpur, Chandpala Anantapathpur and Fatepur.
- Magrahat I, a community development block consisting of rural areas with eleven gram panchayats and nine census towns: Ajodhyanagar, Sirakol, Uttar Bishnupur, Ghola Noapara, Usthi, Barijpur, Uttar Kusum, Kalikapota and Bamna.
- Magrahat II, a community development block consisting of rural areas with fourteen gram panchayats and eight census towns: Dhamua, Shyampur, Nainan, Uttar Kalas, Dihi Kalas, Swangrampur, Bilandapur and Magrahat.
- Diamond Harbour I, a community development block consisting of rural areas with eight gram panchayats and four census towns: Masat, Sangrampur, Mohanpur and Durganagar.
- Diamond Harbour II, a community development block consisting of rural areas with eight gram panchayats and one census town: Patdaha.
- Mandirbazar, a community development block consisting of rural areas with ten gram panchayats and three census towns: Chandpur, Bangsidharpur and Purba Bishnupur.
- Mathurapur I, a community development block consisting of rural areas with ten gram panchayats and four census towns: Purba Ranaghat, Lalpur, Krishna Chandrapur and Mathurapur.
- Mathurapur II, a community development block consisting of rural areas with only eleven gram panchayats.
- Kulpi, a community development block consisting of rural areas with fourteen gram panchayats and two census towns: Berandari Bagaria and Dhola.

=== Kakdwip Subdivision ===
The Kakdwip subdivision consists of:

- Kakdwip, a community development block consisting of rural areas with only eleven gram panchayats.
- Namkhana, a community development block consisting of rural areas with only seven gram panchayats.
- Patharpratima, a community development block consisting of rural areas with only fifteen gram panchayats.
- Sagar, a community development block consisting of rural areas with only nine gram panchayats.

== Representation ==
=== Parliamentary Constituencies ===
The district has five parliamentary constituencies:

1. Jaynagar (SC) (parliamentary constituency no. 19)
2. Mathurapur (SC) (parliamentary constituency no. 20)
3. Diamond Harbour (parliamentary constituency no. 21)
4. Jadavpur (parliamentary constituency no. 22)
5. Kolkata Dakshin (parliamentary constituency no. 23)

=== Assembly Constituencies ===
==== 1997 to 2008 ====
Based on the 1991 census, the district was divided into thirty-two legislative assembly constituencies

1. Gosaba (SC) (assembly constituency no. 100)
2. Basanti (SC) (assembly constituency no. 101)
3. Kultali (SC) (assembly constituency no. 102)
4. Jaynagar (assembly constituency no. 103)
5. Baruipur (assembly constituency no. 104)
6. Canning Paschim (SC) (assembly constituency no. 105)
7. Canning Purba (assembly constituency no. 106)
8. Bhangar (assembly constituency no. 107)
9. Sonarpur (SC) (assembly constituency no. 109)
10. Bishnupur Purba (SC) (assembly constituency no. 110)
11. Bishnupur Paschim (assembly constituency no. 111)
12. Behala Purba (assembly constituency no. 112)
13. Behala Paschim (assembly constituency no. 113)
14. Garden Reach (assembly constituency no. 114)
15. Maheshtala (assembly constituency no. 115)
16. Budge Budge (assembly constituency no. 116)
17. Satgachhia (assembly constituency no. 117)
18. Falta (assembly constituency no. 118)
19. Diamond Harbour (assembly constituency no. 119)
20. Magrahat Paschim (assembly constituency no. 120)
21. Magrahat Purba (SC) (assembly constituency no. 121)
22. Mandirbazar (SC) (assembly constituency no. 122)
23. Mathurapur (assembly constituency no. 123)
24. Kulpi (SC) (assembly constituency no. 124)
25. Patharpratima (assembly constituency no. 125)
26. Kakdwip (assembly constituency no. 126)
27. Sagar (assembly constituency no. 127)
28. Jadavpur (assembly constituency no. 108)
29. Tollyganj (assembly constituency no. 150)
30. Alipore (assembly constituency no. 148)
31. Dhakuria (assembly constituency no. 151)
32. Kabitirtha (assembly constituency no. 147)

Gosaba, Basanti, Kultali, Canning Paschim, Sonarpur, Bishnupur Purba, Magrahat Purba, Mandirbazar and Kulpi constituencies are reserved for Scheduled Castes (SC) candidates. Along with one assembly constituency from North 24 Parganas district, Gosaba, Basanti, Kultali, Jaynagar, Canning Paschim and Canning Purba assembly constituencies form the Jaynagar Lok Sabha constituency, which is reserved for Scheduled Castes (SC). Baruipur, Bishnupur Purba, Kabitirtha, Jadavpur, Behala Paschim, Behala Purba and Magrahat Paschim constituencies form the Jadavpur Lok Sabha constituency. Bishnupur Paschim, Garden Reach, Maheshtala, Budge Budge, Satgachhia, Falta and Diamond Harbour constituencies form the Diamond Harbour Lok Sabha constituency. Magrahat Purba, Mandirbazar, Mathurapur, Kulpi, Patharpratima, Kakdwip and Sagar constituencies form the Mathurapur Lok Sabha constituency, which is reserved for Scheduled Castes (SC). Along with six assembly segments from North 24 Parganas district, Bhangar assembly constituency forms the Basirhat Lok Sabha constituency. Along with three assembly constituencies from Kolkata district, Alipore, Dhakuria, Tollyganj, Sonarpur form the Kolkata Dakshin Lok Sabha constituency.

==== 2008 to Date ====
In the 2008 order of the Delimitation Commission in respect of the delimitation of constituencies in the West Bengal, the district was divided into thirty-one assembly constituencies. Baruipur Purba, Basanti, Bishnupur, Canning Paschim, Gosaba, Kultali, Jaynagar, Magrahat Purba and Mandirbazar constituencies are reserved for Scheduled Castes (SC) candidates.

No.	Constituency	Lok Sabha	MLA	2026 Winner	2024 Lead
127	Gosaba (SC)	Jaynagar	Bikarna Naskar	Bharatiya Janata Party	Trinamool Congress
128	Basanti (SC)	Jaynagar	Nilima Mistry Bishal	Trinamool Congress	Trinamool Congress
129	Kultali (SC)	Jaynagar	Ganesh Chandra Mondal	Trinamool Congress	Trinamool Congress
130	Patharpratima	Mathurapur	Samir Kumar Jana	Trinamool Congress	Trinamool Congress
131	Kakdwip	Mathurapur	Dipankar Jana	Bharatiya Janata Party	Trinamool Congress
132	Sagar	Mathurapur	Sumanta Mandal	Bharatiya Janata Party	Trinamool Congress
133	Kulpi	Mathurapur	Barnali Dhara	Trinamool Congress	Trinamool Congress
134	Raidighi	Mathurapur	Tapas Mondal	Trinamool Congress	Trinamool Congress
135	Mandirbazar (SC)	Mathurapur	Joydeb Halder	Trinamool Congress	Trinamool Congress
136	Jaynagar (SC)	Jaynagar	Biswanath Das	Trinamool Congress	Trinamool Congress
137	Baruipur Purba (SC)	Jadavpur	Bivas Sardar	Trinamool Congress	Trinamool Congress
138	Canning Paschim (SC)	Jaynagar	Paresh Ram Das	Trinamool Congress	Trinamool Congress
139	Canning Purba	Jaynagar	Mohammad Baharul Islam	Trinamool Congress	Trinamool Congress
140	Baruipur Paschim	Jadavpur	Biman Banerjee	Trinamool Congress	Trinamool Congress
141	Magrahat Purba (SC)	Jaynagar	Sharmistha Purkait	Trinamool Congress	Trinamool Congress
142	Magrahat Paschim	Mathurapur	Md. Samim Ahamed Molla	Trinamool Congress	Trinamool Congress
143	Diamond Harbour	Diamond Harbour	Pannalal Halder	Trinamool Congress	Trinamool Congress
144	Falta	Diamond Harbour	Debangshu Panda	Bharatiya Janata Party	Trinamool Congress
145	Satgachhia	Diamond Harbour	Agniswar Naskar	Bharatiya Janata Party	Trinamool Congress
146	Bishnupur (SC)	Diamond Harbour	Dilip Mondal	Trinamool Congress	Trinamool Congress
147	Sonarpur Dakshin	Jadavpur	Roopa Ganguly	Bharatiya Janata Party	Trinamool Congress
148	Bhangar	Jadavpur	Naushad Siddiqui	All India Secular Front	Trinamool Congress
149	Kasba	Kolkata Dakshin	Javed Ahmed Khan	Trinamool Congress	Trinamool Congress
150	Jadavpur	Jadavpur	Sarbori Mukherjee	Bharatiya Janata Party	Trinamool Congress
151	Sonarpur Uttar	Jadavpur	Debasish Dhar	Bharatiya Janata Party	Trinamool Congress
152	Tollygunge	Jadavpur	Papiya Adhikari	Bharatiya Janata Party	Trinamool Congress
153	Behala Purba	Kolkata Dakshin	Shankar Sikder	Bharatiya Janata Party	Trinamool Congress
154	Behala Paschim	Kolkata Dakshin	Indranil Khan	Bharatiya Janata Party	Trinamool Congress
155	Maheshtala	Diamond Harbour	Subhasish Das	Trinamool Congress	Trinamool Congress
156	Budge Budge	Diamond Harbour	Ashok Kumar Deb	Trinamool Congress	Trinamool Congress
157	Metiaburuz	Diamond Harbour	Abdul Khaleque Molla	Trinamool Congress	Trinamool Congress

== Demographics ==
=== Population ===
Historical population
Year	Pop.	±%
1901	1,051,060	—
1911	1,192,223	+13.4%
1921	1,270,191	+6.5%
1931	1,382,264	+8.8%
1941	1,714,176	+24.0%
1951	2,087,414	+21.8%
1961	2,729,269	+30.7%
1971	3,663,788	+34.2%
1981	4,388,102	+19.8%
1991	5,715,030	+30.2%
2001	6,906,689	+20.9%
2011	8,161,961	+18.2%
Source: Census of India

According to the 2011 census of India, South 24 Parganas district had a total population of 8,161,961, roughly equal to the nation of Honduras or the US state of Virginia. This made in the 6th most populous district in India out of a total of 640. The district had a population density of 819 inhabitants per square kilometre (2,120/sq mi). Its population growth rate over the decade 2001–2011 was 18.05%. South 24 Parganas had a sex ratio of 956 females for every 1000 males, and a literacy rate of 77.51%. 25.58% of the population lives in urban areas. Scheduled Castes and Scheduled Tribes made up 24,64,032 (30.19%) and 96,976 (1.19%) of the population respectively.

=== Language ===
Languages of South 24 Parganas district (2011)
1. Bengali (97.8%)
2. Hindi (1.68%)
3. Urdu (0.38%)
4. Others (0.12%)

At the time of the 2011 census, 97.82% of the population spoke Bengali, 1.68% Hindi and 0.38% Urdu as their first language.

=== Religion ===
Religion in South 24 Parganas district (2011 census)
1. Hinduism (63.2%)
2. Islam (35.6%)
3. Christianity (0.81%)
4. No religion (0.30%)
5. Sikhism (0.03%)
6. Buddhism (0.03%)
7. Jainism (0.01%)
8. Other religions (0.07%)

Religion in present-day South 24 Parganas district (Note: Sadar and Diamond Harbour subdivisions of 24 Parganas district excluding Tollygunge, Sonarpore, Behala and Metiabruz thanas)
Religion	Population (1941)	Percentage (1941)	Population (2011)	Percentage (2011)
Hinduism	1,198,847	70.14%	5,155,545	63.17%
Islam	485,791	28.43%	2,903,075	35.57%
Christianity	13,448	0.79%	66,498	0.81%
Tribal religion (Note: All tribals were counted under 'Tribal' in the 1941 census irrespective of actual religion practised.)	10,078	0.59%	6,065	0.07%
Others (Note: Including Jainism, Christianity, Buddhism, Zoroastrianism, Judaism, Ad-Dharmis, or not stated)	1,132	0.05%	39,052	0.38%
Total Population	1,709,296	100%	8,161,961	100%

Population by religion in CD blocks
CD Block	Hindu	Muslim	Other
Thakurpukur Maheshtala	67.32%	26.64%	6.04%
Budge Budge I	54.41%	45.39%	0.20%
Budge Budge II	67.55%	32.23%	0.22%
Bishnupur I	63.54%	31.08%	5.38%
Bishnupur II	62.92%	36.59%	0.48%
Sonarpur	82.49%	14.91%	2.59%
Bhangar I	32.38%	67.38%	0.24%
Bhangar II	29.26%	70.49%	0.25%
Canning I	63.97%	35.49%	0.53%
Canning II	31.08%	67.08%	1.84%
Baruipur	62.87%	34.96%	2.17%
Magrahat II	49.60%	50.01%	0.39%
Magrahat I	40.44%	57.78%	1.78%
Falta	64.86%	35.00%	0.13%
Diamond Harbour I	47.72%	52.16%	0.12%
Diamond Harbour II	59.77%	39.68%	0.55%
Kulpi	61.25%	38.50%	0.53%
Mandirbazar	62.03%	37.65%	0.32%
Mathurapur I	59.44%	40.41%	0.15%
Jaynagar I	53.65%	45.86%	0.49%
Jaynagar II	48.03%	51.23%	0.74%
Kultali	69.81%	29.86%	0.34%
Basanti	53.48%	43.87%	2.64%
Gosaba	88.06%	8.63%	3.31%
Mathurapur II	82.08%	15.37%	2.55%
Kakdwip	82.37%	17.09%	0.54%
Sagar	87.88%	11.73%	0.38%
Namkhana	85.97%	13.88%	0.15%
Patharpratima	88.91%	10.72%	0.37%
Area not under any Sub-district	73.91%	24.97%	1.12%

Hindus are the majority community in most of the district. Scheduled Castes make up nearly half the Hindu population and the majority of rural Hindus. The most populous Scheduled Castes are Poundras and Namashudras. The proportion of Hindus is maximum in the coastal south of the district, especially in the Sunderbans bordering Bangladesh.

Muslims have a greater concentration in the north and west of the district, especially in the rural areas surrounding Kolkata. Christians are also present in small numbers, and have their highest concentration in Thakurpukur Maheshtala where they are 8.84% of the rural population.

== Flora and fauna ==
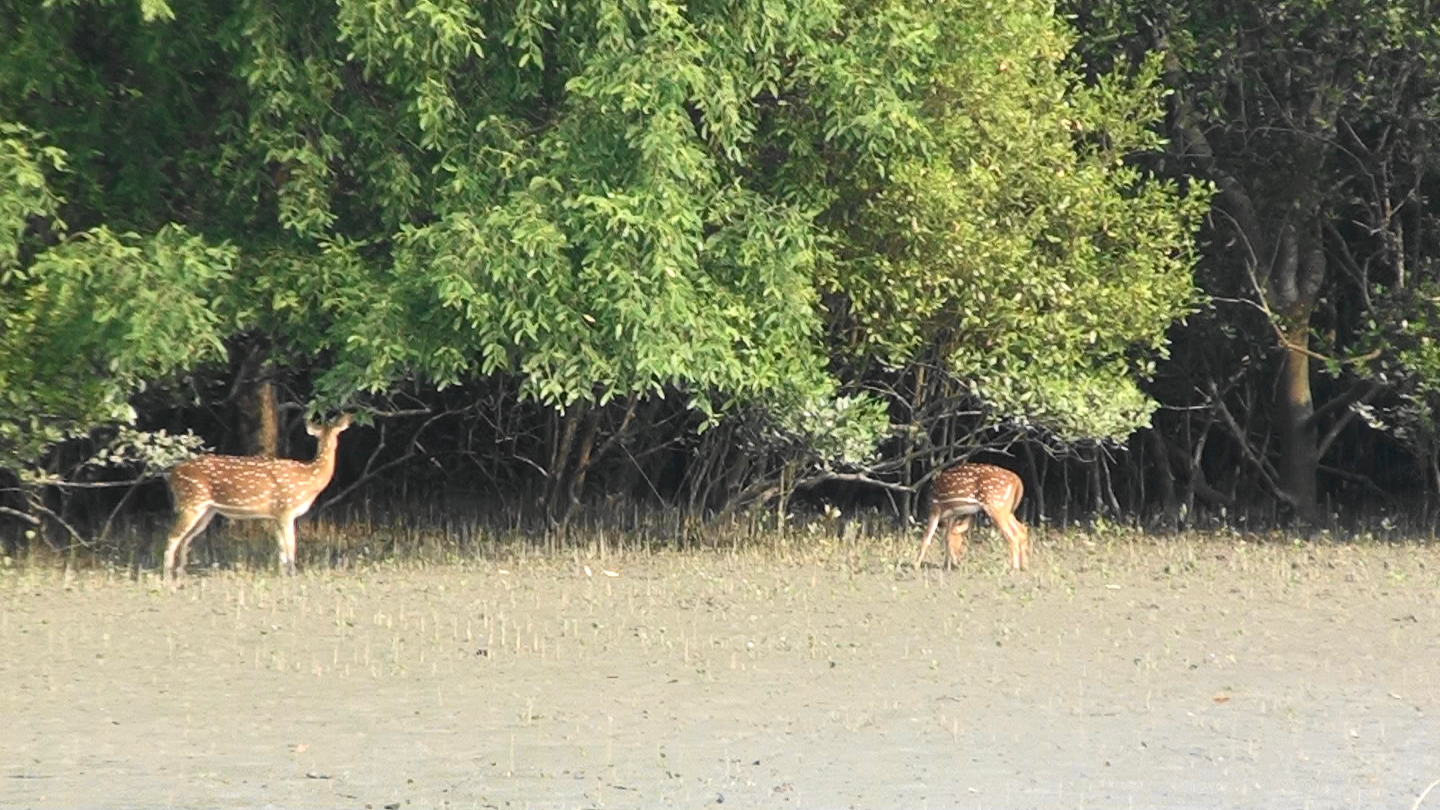
Flora and fauna of the Sundarbans

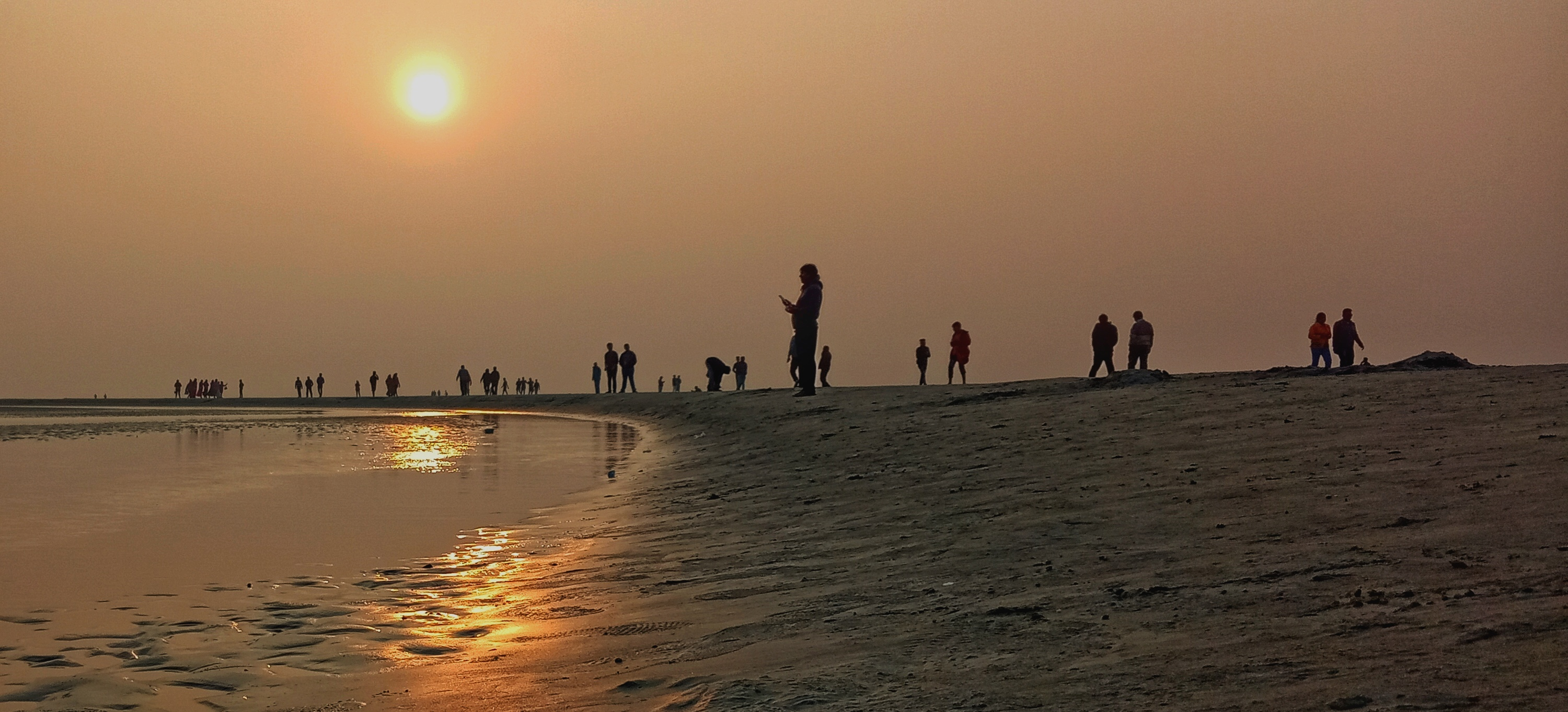
Bakkhali Sea Beach

In 1984, South 24 Parganas district became home to Sundarbans National Park, which has an area of 1,330 km^{2} (513.5 mi^{2}). It shares the park with North 24 Parganas district and is also home to four wildlife sanctuaries: Haliday Island, Lothian Island, Narendrapur, and Sajnekhali.

Sundarbans, formerly Sunderbunds, is a vast tract of forest and saltwater swamp forming the lower part of the Ganges Delta and extending about 260 kilometres (160 mi) along the Bay of Bengal from the Hooghly River Estuary in the north to the Meghna River Estuary in Bangladesh in the east. The whole tract reaches inland for 100 to 130 kilometres (60–80 miles).

A network of estuaries, tidal rivers, and creeks intersected by numerous channels, it encloses flat, marshy islands covered with dense forests. The name Sundarbans is perhaps derived from the word meaning "forest of sundari," a reference to the large mangrove tree that provides valuable fuel. Along the coast the forest passes into a mangrove swamp; the southern region, with numerous wild animals and crocodile-infested estuaries, is virtually uninhabited. It is one of the last preserves of the Royal Bengal tiger and the site of a tiger preservation project. The cultivated northern area yields rice, sugarcane, timber, and betel nuts.

The region is also famous for some commonly domesticated livestock breeds which includes the Garole breed of sheep and China hens or Muscovy ducks, the Garole sheep is considered as the progenitor of the Booroola merino sheep and is noted for its prolific character. However, the wool of the sheep which can be a valuable natural asset does not find any use among the natives. Bakkhali beach resort, located on one of the islands jutting out into the Bay of Bengal, is gaining in popularity, with improvements in transport links with Kolkata. The area has been declared as world heritage site by the UNESCO. Boat tours are provided at many places in the region.

== Economy ==
Agriculture, Industry and Pisciculture are all at their peak in the district. On the west side of the district is the Falta Special Economic Zone (SEZ), which houses various types of industry.

In 2006, the Ministry of Panchayati Raj named South 24 Parganas one of the country's 250 most backward districts (out of a total of 640).

== Education ==
South 24 Parganas district had a literacy rate of 77.51% as per the provisional figures of the census of India 2011. Alipore Sadar subdivision had a literacy rate of 81.14%, Baruipur subdivision 77.45%, Canning subdivision 70.98%, Diamond Harbour subdivision 76.26% and Kakdwip subdivision 82.04%

Given in the table below (data in numbers) is a comprehensive picture of the education scenario in South 24 Parganas district, with data for the year 2013–14:

Subdivision	Primary School		Middle School		High School		Higher Secondary School		General College, Univ.		Technical / Professional Inst.		Non-formal Education	
Subdivision	Number of Institutions	Number of Students	Number of Institutions	Number of Students	Number of Institutions	Number of Students	Number of Institutions	Number of Students	Number of Institutions	Number of Students	Number of Institutions	Number of Students	Number of Institutions	Number of Students
Alipore Sadar	531	53,719	34	4,455	50	16,471	91	66,813	5	8,122	6	3,094	1,379	53,429
Baruipur	883	132,649	65	8,954	50	26,443	128	129,195	8	27,657	7	6,735	3,116	138,507
Canning	532	81,697	59	9,181	29	10,515	55	57,921	4	5,490	1	n/a	2,105	96,622
Diamond Harbour	1,212	116,407	61	6,680	98	38,470	145	113,147	7	20,061	5	1,774	3,140	137,378
Kakdwip	598	53,058	45	5,654	48	20,383	82	56,192	3	5,420	1	100	1,844	78,897
South 24 Parganas district*	3,756	437,530	264	34,924	275	118,282	501	423,268	27	66,750	20	11,703	11,584	504,833

.* Does not include data for portions of South 24 Parganas district functioning under Kolkata Municipal Corporation

== Healthcare ==
The table below (all data in numbers) presents an overview of the medical facilities available and patients treated in the hospitals, health centres and sub-centres in 2014 in South 24 Parganas district.

Subdivision	Number of Facilities									Total Number of Beds	Total Number of Doctors	Number of Patients		
Subdivision	Health & Family Welfare Dept., WB				Other State Govt Depts	Local bodies	Central Govt Depts / PSUs	NGO / Private Nursing Homes	Total	Total Number of Beds	Total Number of Doctors	Number of Patients		
Subdivision	Hospitals	Rural Hospitals	Block Primary Health Centres	Primary Health Centres	Other State Govt Depts	Local bodies	Central Govt Depts / PSUs	NGO / Private Nursing Homes	Total	Total Number of Beds	Total Number of Doctors	Indoor	Outdoor	Total
Alipore Sadar	-	3	3	7	1	3	-	48	65	1,159	199	33,498	633,233	666,731
Baruipur	1	6	1	18	-	2	-	66	94	1,045	201	48,114	1,266,244	1,314,358
Canning	1	3	1	6	-	-	-	15	26	351	49	22,467	666,377	688,844
Diamond Harbour	1	6	3	17	-	-	-	68	95	1077	169	65,051	1,325,535	1,390,586
Kakdwip	1	3	1	11	-	-	-	20	36	458	73	28,707	405,501	434,208
South 24 Parganas district	4	21	9	59	1	5	-	217	316	4,090	691	197,837	4,397,890	4,595,727

Note: The district data does not include data for portions of South 24 Parganas district functioning under Kolkata Municipal Corporation. The number of doctors exclude private bodies.

== Notable people ==
=== Music ===
- Pritam, Indian music director
- Rashid Khan (musician)
- Nirmala Mishra, playback singer
- Hemant Kumar, Indian music director, songwriter, lyricist, writer and poet.
- Salil Chowdhury, Indian music director, songwriter, lyricist, writer and poet
- Kabir Suman, Indian singer-songwriter, musician, music director, music composer, writer, actor, politician, and former journalist

=== Freedom fighters ===
- Kanailal Bhattacharjee, Bengali revolutionary nationalist
- Subhas Chandra Bose, nationalist
- Sarat Chandra Bose, nationalist

=== Social reform ===
- Sivanath Shastri, Bengali social reformer, writer, translator, scholar, editor, philosopher and historian

=== Sports ===
- Sourav Ganguly, Indian cricketer and cricket commentator

=== Advocates ===
- Janakinath Bose, Indian advocate

=== Writers ===
- Shakti Chattopadhyay, Indian poet and writer
- Ashapurna Devi, Indian poet and writer
- Srijato, Indian poet and writer

=== Film Personality ===
- Anurag Basu, filmmaker
- Kaushik Ganguly, filmmaker
- Utpal Dutt, Indian actor
- Rajatava Dutta, Indian actor
- Mahesh Manjrekar, filmmaker, actor
- Madhumita Sarcar, actress
- Soham Chakraborty, actor
- Ena Saha, Indian actor
- Kaushik Sen, Indian actor
- Riddhi Sen, Indian actor
- Rwitobroto Mukherjee, Indian actor
- Srijit Mukherji, Indian actor
- Mokksha, Indian Actress

=== Filmmaker ===
- Premendra Mitra, Indian filmmaker and writer
- Satyajit Ray, Indian director, scriptwriter
- Subhankar Chattopadhyay, Indian director, scriptwriter, content creator
- Sujit Mondal, Indian filmmaker and writer
- Goutam Ghose, Indian filmmaker and writer
- Srijit Mukherji, Indian filmmaker and writer

=== Dance ===
- Dona Ganguly, Indian Dancer

=== Physicians ===
- Nilratan Sircar, Indian medical doctor, educationist, philanthropist and swadeshi entrepreneur
- Tarun Mandal, Indian medical doctor, writer, Member of Parliament

=== Religious Scholars ===
- Shyamal Bose (bishop)
- Linus Nirmal Gomes, Indian Roman Catholic prelate

=== Others ===
- Pratima Mondal, Member of Parliament
- Abhishek Banerjee (politician), Member of Parliament
- Firdousi Begum, Indian politician
- Abdur Razzak Molla, Minister for Land and Land Reforms

== Auditorium ==
- Dhanadhanya Auditorium
- Madhusudan Mancha
- Nazrul Mancha
- Rabindra Sadan

== See also ==
- List of districts of West Bengal
- List of districts in India
