= Deulpota =

Archaeological site in West Bengal, India

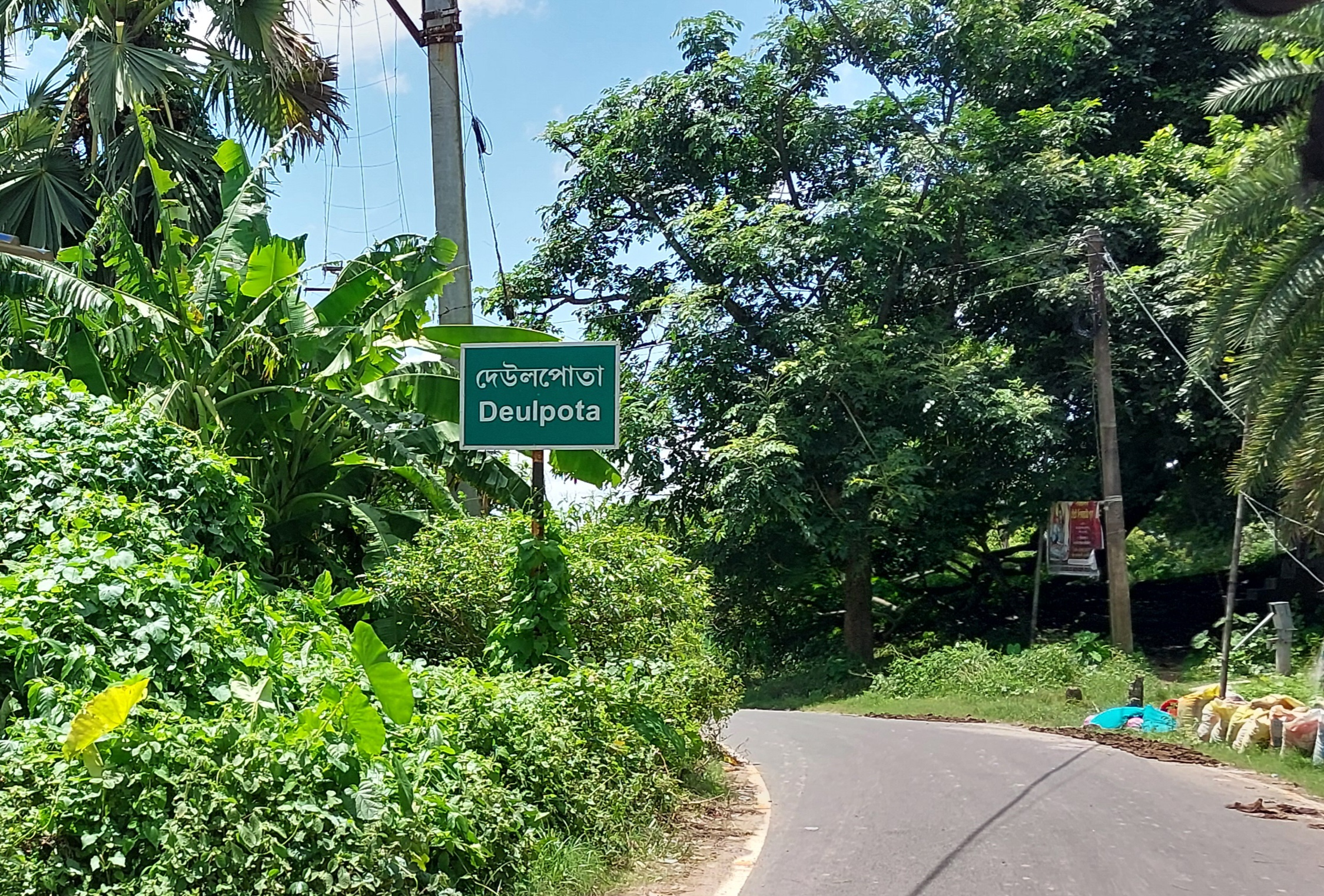
- Deulpota village

- Location within West Bengal
- 22°12′02.4″N 88°9′30.5″E
- Type: Settlement
- Location: Diamond Harbour, West Bengal, India
- Region: South 24 Parganas

History
- Built: 2nd century BCE

Deulpota is an archaeological site located beside the Hooghly river, in the Diamond Harbour II CD block in the Diamond Harbour subdivision of the South 24 Parganas district in the Indian state of West Bengal.

== Geography ==
Cities and towns in the western part of Diamond Harbour subdivision (including Falta, Diamond Harbour I & II, Kulpi CD blocks) in South 24 Parganas district
M: municipal city/ town, CT: census town, R: rural/ urban centre, N: neighbourhood, H: historical place/ religious centre
Owing to space constraints in the small map, the actual locations in a larger map may vary slightly

=== Location ===
Deulpota is located at 22°12′02.4″N 88°9′30.5″E. It has an elevation of 7m above mean sea level.

Note: The map alongside presents some of the notable locations in the subdivision. All places marked in the map are linked in the larger full screen map.

== Excavations ==
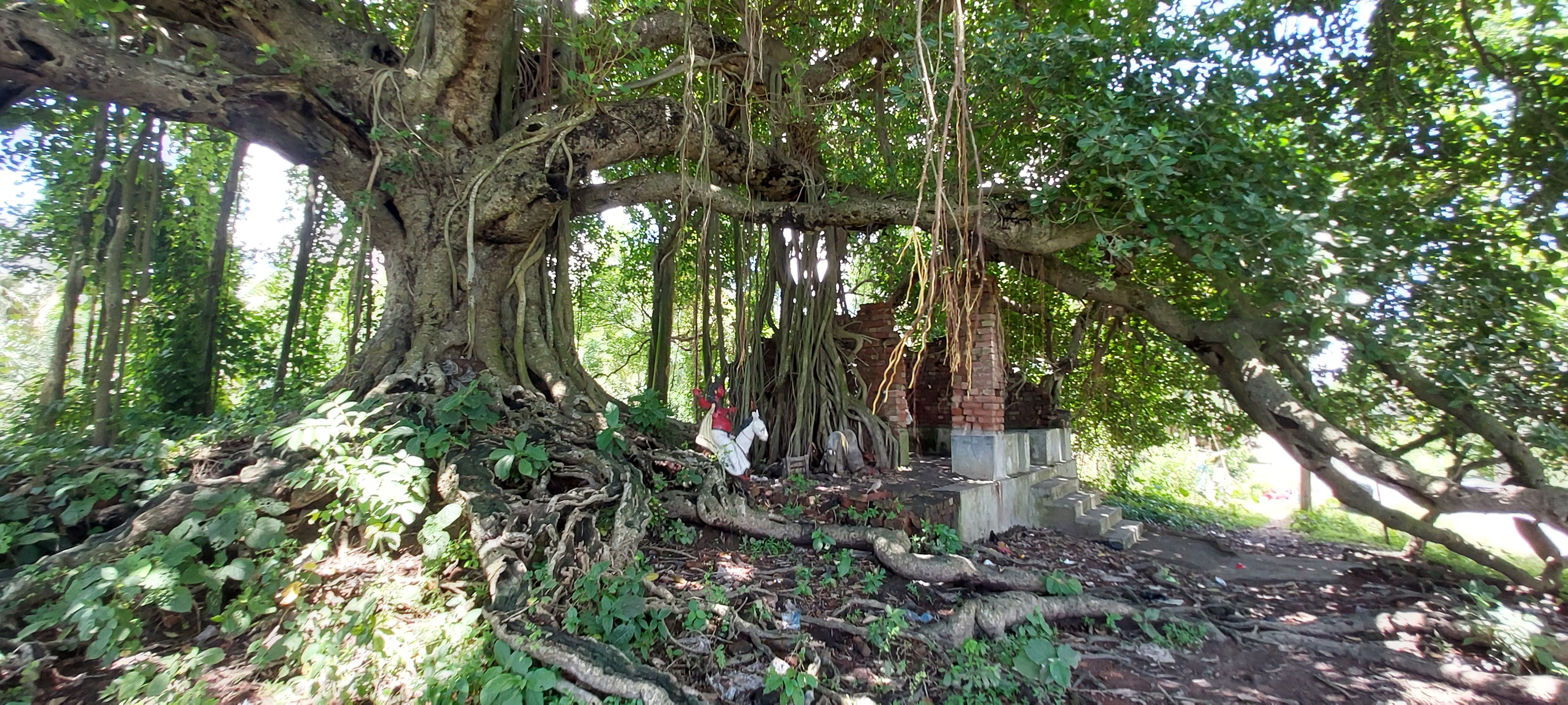
Deulpota temple

According to the District Census Handbook, South 24 Parganas Deulpota on the bank of river Hooghly is an important archaeological site. “Excavations in this place have been initiated back in 1963-64, 1964-65 and 1972-73 and variety of artefacts from Gupta ages and early medieval period have been found. The items include fine terracotta pottery, jewellery made of precious and semiprecious stones, silver and copper coins, female figurines including famed Yakshini idol, Gajalakshmi Plaque, burnt polished and unpolished earthen ware, ceramic pottery etc.” There is a black stone embedded in a mound at Deulpota which is worshipped as Shiva Linga.

According to Sharmi Chakraborty, Centre for archaeological Studies and Training, Eastern India, pottery including rouletted ware of the Sunga Kushana period have been found.
