= Harinarayanpur, Kulpi =

Archaeological site in West Bengal, India

Harinarayanpur
- Location within West Bengal
- 22°8′22.5″N 88°13′51.1″E
- Type: Settlement
- Location: West Bengal, India
- Region: South 24 Parganas

History
- Built: 2nd century BCE

Harinarayanpur is an archaeological site in the Kulpi CD block in the Diamond Harbour subdivision of the South 24 Parganas district in the Indian state of West Bengal.

== Geography ==
Cities and towns in the western part of Diamond Harbour subdivision (including Falta, Diamond Harbour I & II, Kulpi CD blocks) in South 24 Parganas district
M: municipal city/ town, CT: census town, R: rural/ urban centre, N: neighbourhood, H: historical place/ religious centre
Owing to space constraints in the small map, the actual locations in a larger map may vary slightly

=== Location ===
Harinarayanpur is located at 22°8′22.5″N 88°13′51.1″E. It has an elevation of 4m above mean sea level.

Note: The map alongside presents some of the notable locations in the subdivision. All places marked in the map are linked in the larger full screen map.

== Findings ==
According to Sharmi Chakraborty, Centre for archaeological Studies and Training, Eastern India, terracotta plaques, semi-precious stone beads and pottery of the Sunga Kushana period have been found.
