= Magrahat II =

Community Development Block in West Bengal, India

- Community Development Block
- Location of Magrahat II community development block in South 24 Parganas district
- Coordinates: 22.2420°N 88.3784°E
- Country: India
- State: West Bengal
- Division: Presidency
- District: South 24 Parganas
- Subdivision: Diamond Harbour
- Headquarters: Magrahat

Government
  - Gram Panchayats: Amratala, Dhamua Dakshin, Dhamua Uttar, Dhanpota, Dihikalas, Gokarni, Hotor Morjada, Jugdia, Magrahat Paschim, Magrahat Purba, Mohanpur, Multi, Nainan, Urelchandpur
  - Lok Sabha constituencies: Jaynagar
  - Vidhan Sabha constituencies: Magrahat Purba

Area
  - Total: 136.93 km^{2} (52.87 sq mi)

Population (2011)
  - Total: 304,744
  - Density: 2,225.5/km^{2} (5,764.1/sq mi)
  - Urban: 86,240

Demographics
  - Literacy: 77.41 per cent
  - Sex ratio: 946 ♂/♀

Languages
  - Official: Bengali
  - Additional official: English
- Time zone: UTC+05:30 (IST)
- Website: s24pgs.gov.in

Magrahat II is a community development block that forms an administrative division in Diamond Harbour subdivision of South 24 Parganas district in the Indian state of West Bengal.

== Geography ==

Magrahat II CD block is located at 22°14′31″N 88°22′42″E. It has an average elevation of 8 metres (26 ft).

Magrahat II CD block is bounded by Bishnupur I and Baruipur CD blocks in the north, Jaynagar I CD block in the east, Mandirbazar CD block in the south and Magrahat I CD block in the west.

South 24 Parganas district is divided into two distinct physiographic zones: the marine-riverine delta in the north and the marine delta zone in the south. As the sea receded southwards, in the sub-recent geological period, a large low-lying plain got exposed. Both tidal inflows and the rivers have deposited sediments in this plain. The periodical collapse of both the natural levees and man-made embankments speed up the process of filling up the depressions containing brackish water wetlands. The marine delta in the south is formed of interlacing tidal channels. As non-saline water for irrigation is scarce, agriculture is monsoon-dominated. Some parts of the wetlands are still preserved for raising fish.

Magrahat II CD block has an area of 136.93 km^{2}. It has 1 panchayat samity, 14 gram panchayats, 214 gram sansads (village councils), 84 mouzas and 78 inhabited villages, as per the District Statistical Handbook, South Twenty-four Parganas. Magrahat police station serves this CD Block. Headquarters of this CD block is at Magrahat.

Gram panchayats of Magrahat II CD block/panchayat samiti are: Amratala, Dhamua Dakshin, Dhamua Uttar, Dhanpota, Dihikalas, Gokarni, Hotor Morjada, Jugdia, Magrahat Paschim, Magrahat Purba, Mohanpur, Multi, Nainan and Urelchandpur.

== Demographics ==
=== Population ===
As per the 2011 Census of India, Magrahat II CD block had a total population of 304,744, of which 218,504 were rural and 86,240 were urban. There were 156,568 (51%) males and 148,176 (49%) females. Population below 6 years was 40,189. Scheduled Castes numbered 106,460 (34.61%) and Scheduled Tribes numbered 159 (0.05%).

As per the 2001 Census of India, Magrahat II CD block had a total population of 262,022, out of which 135,145 were males and 126,877 were females. Magrahat II CD block registered a population growth of 17.26% during the 1991-2001 decade. Decadal growth for South 24 Parganas district was 20.89%. Decadal growth in West Bengal was 17.84%. Scheduled Castes at 98,469 formed over one-third the population. Scheduled Tribes numbered 2,086.

Census Towns in Magrahat II CD block (2011 census figures in brackets): Dhamua (10,055), Shyampur (22,024), Nainan (6,772), Uttar Kalas (6,474), Dihi Kalas (11,494), Swangrampur (5,699), Bilandapur (6,330) and Magrahat (17,392).

Large villages (with 4,000+ population) in Magrahat II CD block (2011 census figures in brackets): Chak Parankanta Khali (7,864), Uttar Amratala (4,483), Hotar (4,155), Marjyada (4,021), Kuldia (4,653), Mirzapur (4,049), Uttar Radhanagar (6,070), Harisankarpur (11,887), Mamudpur (4,367), Dakshin Kashi (4,490), Bisheshwarpur (4,443), Urel Chandpur (4,668), Gokarni (8,022), Barat Kamdebpur (8,660), Multi (10,215), Ramchandranagar (10,881) and Jugdia (13,579).

Other villages in Magrahat II CD block include (2011 census figures in brackets): Dhanpota (3,326) and Uttar Mohanpur (3,744).

=== Literacy ===
As per the 2011 census, the total number of literates in Magrahat II CD block was 204,789 (77.41% of the population over 6 years) out of which males numbered 113,744 (83.62% of the male population over 6 years) and females numbered 91,045 (70.84% of the female population over 6 years). The gender disparity (the difference between female and male literacy rates) was 12.78%.

As per the 2011 Census of India, literacy in South 24 Parganas district was 77.51%. Literacy in West Bengal was 77.08% in 2011. Literacy in India in 2011 was 74.04%.

As per the 2001 Census of India, Magrahat II CD block had a total literacy of 67.24% for the 6+ age group. While male literacy was 77.89% female literacy was 55.85%. South 24 Parganas district had a total literacy of 69.45%, male literacy being 79.19% and female literacy being 59.01%.

See also – List of West Bengal districts ranked by literacy rate

Literacy in CD blocks of
South 24 Parganas district
Alipore Sadar subdivision
Bishnupur I – 78.33%
Bishnupur II – 81.37%
Budge Budge I – 80.57%
Budge Budge II – 79.13%
Thakurpukur Maheshtala – 83.54%
Baruipur subdivision
Baruipur – 76.46%
Bhangar I – 72.06%
Bhangar II – 74.49%
Jaynagar I – 73.17%
Jaynagar II – 69.71%
Kultali – 69.37%
Sonarpur – 79.70%
Canning subdivision
Basanti – 68.32%
Canning I – 70.76%
Canning II – 66.51%
Gosaba – 78.98%
Diamond Harbour subdivision
Diamond Harbour I – 75.72%
Diamond Harbour II – 76.91%
Falta – 77.17%
Kulpi – 75.49%
Magrahat I – 73.82%
Magrahat II – 77.41%
Mandirbazar – 75.89%
Mathurapur I – 73.93%
Mathurapur II – 77.77%
Kakdwip subdivision
Kakdwip – 77.93%
Namkhana – 85.72
Patharpratima – 82.11%
Sagar – 84.21%
Source: 2011 Census: CD Block Wise
Primary Census Abstract Data

=== Language ===
Languages of Magrahat II CD block (2011)
1. Bengali (99.8%)
2. Hindi (0.12%)
3. Urdu (0.02%)
4. Others (0.01%)

At the time of the 2011 census, 99.85% of the population spoke Bengali, 0.12% Hindi and 0.02% Urdu as their first language.

=== Religion ===
Religion in Magrahat II CD block (2011)
| Islam | 50.01% |
| Hinduism | 48.60% |
| Christianity | 1.16% |
| Other or not stated | 0.23% |

In the 2011 Census of India, Muslims numbered 152,412 and formed 50.01% of the population in Magrahat II CD block. Hindus numbered 148,091 and formed 48.60% of the population. Others numbered 4,241 and formed 1.39% of the population. Amongst the others, Christians numbered 3,542. In 2001, Hindus were 51.36% of the population, while Muslims and Christians were 47.47% and 1.08% of the population respectively.

The proportion of Hindus in South Twenty-four Parganas district has declined from 76.0% in 1961 to 63.2% in 2011. The proportion of Muslims in South Twenty-four Parganas district has increased from 23.4% to 35.6% during the same period. Christians formed 0.8% in 2011.

== Rural poverty ==
As per the Human Development Report for South 24 Parganas district, published in 2009, in Magrahat II CD block the percentage of households below poverty line was 29.26%, a moderate level of poverty. In the north-east and mid central portion of the district, all CD blocks, with the exception of Kulpi CD block, had poverty rates below 30%. As per rural household survey in 2005, the proportion of households in South 24 Parganas with poverty rates below poverty line was 34.11%, way above the state and national poverty ratios. The poverty rates were very high in the Sundarbans settlements with all thirteen CD blocks registering poverty ratios above 30% and eight CD blocks had more than 40% of the population in the BPL category.

== Economy ==
=== Livelihood ===
Livelihood
in Magrahat II CD block
1. Cultivators (9.95%)
2. Agricultural labourers (20.6%)
3. Household industries (14.4%)
4. Other Workers (55.1%)

In Magrahat II CD block in 2011, amongst the class of total workers, cultivators numbered 10,145 and formed 9.95%, agricultural labourers numbered 21,016 and formed 20.61%, household industry workers numbered 14,644 and formed 14.36% and other workers numbered 56,161 and formed 55.08%. Total workers numbered 101,966 and formed 33.46% of the total population, and non-workers numbered 202,788 and formed 66.54% of the population.

The District Human Development Report points out that in the blocks of region situated in the close proximity of the Kolkata metropolis, overwhelming majority are involved in the non-agricultural sector for their livelihood. On the other hand, in the Sundarban region, overwhelming majority are dependent on agriculture. In the intermediate region, there is again predominance of the non-agricultural sector. Though the region is not very close to Kolkata, many places are well connected and some industrial/ economic development has taken place.

Note: In the census records a person is considered a cultivator, if the person is engaged in cultivation/ supervision of land owned by self/government/institution. When a person who works on another person's land for wages in cash or kind or share, is regarded as an agricultural labourer. Household industry is defined as an industry conducted by one or more members of the family within the household or village, and one that does not qualify for registration as a factory under the Factories Act. Other workers are persons engaged in some economic activity other than cultivators, agricultural labourers and household workers. It includes factory, mining, plantation, transport and office workers, those engaged in business and commerce, teachers, entertainment artistes and so on.

=== Infrastructure ===
There are 78 inhabited villages in Magrahat II CD block, as per the District Census Handbook, South Twenty-four Parganas, 2011. 100% villages have power supply. 78 villages (100%) have drinking water supply. 15 villages (19.23%) have post offices. 75 villages (96.15%) have telephones (including landlines, public call offices and mobile phones). 33 villages (42.31%) have pucca (paved) approach roads and 34 villages (51.59%) have transport communication (includes bus service, rail facility and navigable waterways). 4 villages (5.13%) have agricultural credit societies and 5 villages (6.41%) have banks.

=== Agriculture ===
South 24 Parganas had played a significant role in the Tebhaga movement launched by the Communist Party of India in 1946. Subsequently, Operation Barga was aimed at securing tenancy rights for the peasants. In Magrahat II CD block 407.19 acres of land was acquired and vested. Out of this 267.28 acres or 70.54% of the vested land was distributed. The total number of patta (document) holders was 1,582.

According to the District Human Development Report, agriculture is an important source of livelihood in South Twentyfour Parganas district. The amount of cultivable land per agricultural worker is only 0.41 hectare in the district. Moreover, the irrigation facilities have not been extended to a satisfactory scale. Agriculture mostly remains a mono-cropped activity.

As per the District Census Handbook, the saline soil of the district is unfit for cultivation, but the non-salty lands are very fertile. While rice is the main food crop, jute is the main cash crop.

In 2013-14, there were 90 fertiliser depots, 22 seed stores and 65 fair price shops in Magrahat II CD block.

In 2013–14, Magrahat II CD block produced 2,721 tonnes of Aman paddy, the main winter crop, from 1,468 hectares, 28,465 tonnes of Boro paddy (spring crop) from 8,436 hectares, 804 tonnes of jute from 38 hectares, 997 tonnes of potatoes from 48 hectares, 1,804 tonnes of sugar cane from 18 hectares. It also produced pulses and oilseeds.

=== Pisciculture ===
In Magrahat II CD block, in 2013-14, net area under effective pisciculture was 1,030 hectares, engaging 3,130 persons in the profession, and with an approximate annual production of 7,670 quintals.

Pisciculture is an important source of employment in South 24 Parganas district. As of 2001, more than 4.5 lakh people were engaged in Pisciculture. Out of this 2.57 lakhs were from the 13 blocks in the Sundarbans settlements.

=== Banking ===
In 2013-14, Magrahat II CD block had offices of 7 commercial banks and 4 gramin banks.

=== Backward Regions Grant Fund ===
South 24 Parganas district is listed as a backward region and receives financial support from the Backward Regions Grant Fund. The fund, created by the Government of India, is designed to redress regional imbalances in development. As of 2012, 272 districts across the country were listed under this scheme. The list includes 11 districts of West Bengal.

== Transport ==
Magrahat II CD block has 1 ferry service and 2 originating/ terminating bus routes.

Hotar, Dhamua, Uttar Radhanagar and Magra Hat are stations on the Sealdah South section.

== Education ==
In 2013-14, Magrahat II CD block had 135 primary schools with 17,370 students, 1 middle school with 113 students, 7 high schools with 3,390 students and 17 higher secondary schools with 18,535 students. Magrahat II CD block had 1 general degree college with 3,527 students and 427 institutions for special and non-formal education with 18,088 students.

See also – Education in India

As per the 2011 census, in Magrahat II CD block, amongst the 78 inhabited villages, 1 village did not have a school, 25 villages had two or more primary schools, 20 villages had at least 1 primary and 1 middle school and 16 villages had at least 1 middle and 1 secondary school.

Magrahat College was established at Magrahat in 1996.

== Healthcare ==
Certain areas of South 24 Parganas district have been identified where ground water is affected by Arsenic Contamination. High levels of arsenic in ground water were found in twelve CD blocks of the district. Water samples collected from tubewells in the affected places contained arsenic above the normal level (10 micrograms per litre as specified by the World Health Organization). The affected CD blocks are Baruipur, Bhangar I, Bhangar II, Bishnupur I, Bishnupur II, Basanti, Budge Budge II, Canning I, Canning II, Sonarpur, Magrahat II and Jaynagar I.

In 2014, Magrahat II CD block had 1 rural hospital, 2 primary health centres and 6 private nursing homes with total 70 beds and 10 doctors (excluding private bodies). It had 36 family welfare subcentres. 2,919 patients were treated indoor and 209,267 patients were treated outdoor in the hospitals, health centres and subcentres of the CD block.

As per 2011 census, in Magrahat II CD block, 2 villages had primary health centres, 18 villages had primary health subcentres, 19 villages had maternity and child welfare centres, 16 villages had medicine shops and out of the 78 inhabited villages 12 villages had no medical facilities.

Magrahat Rural Hospital at Magrahat, with 30 beds, is the major government medical facility in Magrahat II CD block. There are primary health centres at Mohanpur (with 6 beds) and Gokarni (with 6 beds).
