= Shyampur, Magrahat =

Shyampur
- Census Town
- Location in West Bengal Location in India
- Coordinates: 22.2815°N 88.3882°E
- Country: India
- State: West Bengal
- District: South 24 Parganas
- CD block: Magrahat II

Area
  - Total: 7.45 km^{2} (2.88 sq mi)
- Elevation: 8 m (26 ft)

Population (2011)
  - Total: 22,024
  - Density: 2,960/km^{2} (7,660/sq mi)

Languages
  - Official: Bengali
  - Additional official: English
- Time zone: UTC+5:30 (IST)
- PIN: 743355
- Telephone code: +91 3174
- Vehicle registration: WB-19 to WB-22, WB-95 to WB-99
- Lok Sabha constituency: Jaynagar (SC)
- Vidhan Sabha constituency: Magrahat Purba (SC)
- Website: www.s24pgs.gov.in

Shyampur is a census town within the jurisdiction of the Magrahat police station in the Magrahat II CD block in the Diamond Harbour subdivision of the South 24 Parganas district in the Indian state of West Bengal.

== Geography ==
Cities and towns in the eastern part of Diamond Harbour subdivision (including Magrahat I & II, Mandirbazar, Mathurapur I & II CD blocks) in South 24 Parganas district
M: municipal city/ town, CT: census town, R: rural/ urban centre, N: neighbourhood, T: religious centre
Owing to space constraints in the small map, the actual locations in a larger map may vary slightly

=== Area overview ===
Diamond Harbour subdivision is a rural subdivision with patches of urbanization. Only 14.61% of the population lives in the urban areas and an overwhelming 85.39% lives in the rural areas. In the eastern portion of the subdivision (shown in the map alongside) there are 24 census towns. The entire district is situated in the Ganges Delta and the eastern part of the district is a flat plain area with small towns, many in clusters. Location of places in the larger map varies a little. It is an OpenStreetMap, while we are using coordinates as in Google Maps.

Note: The map alongside presents some of the notable locations in the subdivision. All places marked in the map are linked in the larger full screen map.

=== Location ===
Shyampur is located at 22.2815°N 88.3882°E

Uttar Kalas, Dihi Kalas, Swangrampur and after a small gap Magrahat and Bilandapur form a cluster of census towns in the south-east corner of the Magrahat II CD block, as per the map of the Magrahat II CD block in the District Census Handbook for South 24 Parganas. Dhamua, Shyampur and Nainan form another cluster of census towns closeby in the Magrahat II CD block.

== Demographics ==
According to the 2011 Census of India, Shyampur had a total population of 22,024 of which 11,415 (52%) were males and 10,609 (48%) were females. There were 2,850 persons in the age range of 0–6 years. The total number of literate persons in Shyampur was 15,230 (79.43% of the population over 6 years).

== Infrastructure ==
According to the District Census Handbook 2011, Shyampur covered an area of 7.4513 km^{2}. Among the civic amenities, it had 66 km roads, the protected water supply involved overhead tank. It had 1,297 domestic electric connections. Among the medical facilities it had 1 maternity and child welfare centre and 1 medicine shop. Among the educational facilities it had were 14 primary schools, 2 middle schools, 2 secondary schools, 1 senior secondary school, the nearest general degree college at Magrahat 12 km away. Among the social, recreational and cultural facilities it had 1 public library, 1 reading room. Important commodities it produced were: silver ornaments, biri.

== Transport ==
Shyampur is on the Dhamua-Magrahat Road.

Dhamua railway station is located nearby.

== Healthcare ==
Magrahat Rural Hospital, with 30 beds, at Magrahat, is the major government medical facility in the Magrahat II CD block.
