= Jugdia =

- Village
- Location in West Bengal Location in India
- Coordinates: 22.2518°N 88.4331°E
- Country: India
- State: West Bengal
- District: South 24 Parganas
- CD Block: Magrahat II

Area
  - Total: 4.82 km^{2} (1.86 sq mi)
- Elevation: 8 m (26 ft)

Population (2011)
  - Total: 13,579
  - Density: 2,820/km^{2} (7,300/sq mi)

Languages
  - Official: Bengali
  - Additional official: English
- Time zone: UTC+5:30 (IST)
- PIN: 743355
- Telephone code: +91 3174
- Vehicle registration: WB-19 to WB-22, WB-95 to WB-99
- Lok Sabha constituency: Jaynagar (SC)
- Vidhan Sabha constituency: Magrahat Purba (SC)
- Website: www.s24pgs.gov.in

Jugdia is a village and a gram panchayat within the jurisdiction of the Magrahat police station in the Magrahat II CD block in the Diamond Harbour subdivision of the South 24 Parganas district in the Indian state of West Bengal.

== Geography ==
Jugdia is located at 22°15′06″N 88°25′59″E. It has an average elevation of 8 metres (26 ft).

== Demographics ==
As per 2011 Census of India, Jugdia had a total population of 13,579.

== Transport ==
A short stretch of local roads link Jugdia to the State Highway 1.

Hogla railway station is located nearby.

== Healthcare ==
Magrahat Rural Hospital, with 30 beds, at Magrahat, is the major government medical facility in the Magrahat II CD block.
