= Nainan =

- Census Town
- Location in West Bengal Location in India
- Coordinates: 22.2765°N 88.3502°E
- Country: India
- State: West Bengal
- District: South 24 Parganas
- CD block: Magrahat II

Area
  - Total: 1.85 km^{2} (0.71 sq mi)
- Elevation: 8 m (26 ft)

Population (2011)
  - Total: 6,772
  - Density: 3,660/km^{2} (9,480/sq mi)

Languages
  - Official: Bengali
  - Additional official: English
- Time zone: UTC+5:30 (IST)
- PIN: 743504
- Telephone code: +91 3174
- Vehicle registration: WB-19 to WB-22, WB-95 to WB-99
- Lok Sabha constituency: Jaynagar (SC)
- Vidhan Sabha constituency: Magrahat Purba (SC)
- Website: www.s24pgs.gov.in

Nainan is a census town and a gram panchayat within the jurisdiction of the Magrahat police station in the Magrahat II CD block in the Diamond Harbour subdivision of the South 24 Parganas district in the Indian state of West Bengal.

== Geography ==
Cities and towns in the eastern part of Diamond Harbour subdivision (including Magrahat I & II, Mandirbazar, Mathurapur I & II CD blocks) in South 24 Parganas district
M: municipal city/ town, CT: census town, R: rural/ urban centre, N: neighbourhood, T: religious centre
Owing to space constraints in the small map, the actual locations in a larger map may vary slightly

=== Area overview ===
Diamond Harbour subdivision is a rural subdivision with patches of urbanization. Only 14.61% of the population lives in the urban areas and an overwhelming 85.39% lives in the rural areas. In the eastern portion of the subdivision (shown in the map alongside) there are 24 census towns. The entire district is situated in the Ganges Delta and the eastern part of the district is a flat plain area with small towns, many in clusters. Location of places in the larger map varies a little. It is an OpenStreetMap, while we are using coordinates as in Google Maps.

Note: The map alongside presents some of the notable locations in the subdivision. All places marked in the map are linked in the larger full screen map.

=== Location ===
Nainan is located at 22.2765°N 88.3502°E

Uttar Kalas, Dihi Kalas, Swangrampur and after a small gap Magrahat and Bilandapur form a cluster of census towns in the south-east corner of the Magrahat II CD block, as per the map of the Magrahat II CD block in the District Census Handbook for the South 24 Parganas. Dhamua, Shyampur and Nainan form another cluster of census towns closeby in the Magrahat II CD block.

== Demographics ==
According to the 2011 Census of India, Nainan had a total population of 6,772 of which 3,533 (52%) were males and 3,239 (48%) were females. There were 1,040 persons in the age range of 0–6 years. The total number of literate persons in Nainan was 4,832 (84.30% of the population over 6 years).

== Infrastructure ==
According to the District Census Handbook 2011, Nainan covered an area of 1.8491 km^{2}. Among the civic amenities, it had 6 km roads with open drains, the protected water supply involved overhead tank. It had 500 domestic electric connections. Among the medical facilities it had 1 maternity and child welfare centre, a nursing home 3 km away, a veterinary hospital 3 km away and 2 medicine shops in the town. Among the educational facilities it had were 2 primary schools, the nearest middle school, the nearest secondary school at Maheshpur 3 km away, the nearest senior secondary school at Kuldia 3 km away, the nearest general degree college at Magrahat 8 km away. An important commodity it produced was paddy.

== Transport ==
Uttar Radhanagar railway station is located nearby.

== Education ==
Kuldia High School is a Bengali-medium coeducational institution established in 1965. It has facilities for teaching from class V to class X.

Kuldia Mohanpur High Madrasah is a Bengali-medium coeducational institution established in 1969. It has facilities for teaching from class V to class XII. It is affiliated with the West Bengal Board of Madrasa Education.

== Healthcare ==
Magrahat Rural Hospital, with 30 beds, at Magrahat, is the major government medical facility in the Magrahat II CD block.
