= Bilandapur =

- Census Town
- Location in West Bengal Location in India
- Coordinates: 22.2348°N 88.3713°E
- Country: India
- State: West Bengal
- District: South 24 Parganas
- CD block: Magrahat II

Area
  - Total: 0.45 km^{2} (0.17 sq mi)
- Elevation: 8 m (26 ft)

Population (2011)
  - Total: 6,330
  - Density: 14,000/km^{2} (36,000/sq mi)

Languages
  - Official: Bengali
  - Additional official: English
- Time zone: UTC+5:30 (IST)
- PIN: 743355
- Telephone code: +91 3174
- Vehicle registration: WB-19 to WB-22, WB-95 to WB-99
- Lok Sabha constituency: Jaynagar (SC)
- Vidhan Sabha constituency: Magrahat Purba (SC)
- Website: www.s24pgs.gov.in

Bilandapur is a census town within the jurisdiction of the Magrahat police station in the Magrahat II CD block in the Diamond Harbour subdivision of the South 24 Parganas district in the Indian state of West Bengal.

== Geography ==
Cities and towns in the eastern part of Diamond Harbour subdivision (including Magrahat I & II, Mandirbazar, Mathurapur I & II CD blocks) in South 24 Parganas district
M: municipal city/ town, CT: census town, R: rural/ urban centre, N: neighbourhood, T: religious centre
Owing to space constraints in the small map, the actual locations in a larger map may vary slightly

=== Area overview ===
Diamond Harbour subdivision is a rural subdivision with patches of urbanization. Only 14.61% of the population lives in the urban areas and an overwhelming 85.39% lives in the rural areas. In the eastern portion of the subdivision (shown in the map alongside) there are 24 census towns. The entire district is situated in the Ganges Delta and the eastern part of the district is a flat plain area with small towns, many in clusters. Location of places in the larger map varies a little. It is an OpenStreetMap, while we are using coordinates as in Google Maps.

Note: The map alongside presents some of the notable locations in the subdivision. All places marked in the map are linked in the larger full screen map.

=== Location ===
Bilandapur is located at 22°14′05″N 88°22′17″E. It has an average elevation of 8 metres (26 ft).

Uttar Kalas, Dihi Kalas, Swangrampur and after a small gap Magrahat and Bilandapur form a cluster of census towns in the south-east corner of the Magrahat II CD block, as per the map of the Magrahat II CD block in the District Census Handbook for the South 24 Parganas. Dhamua, Shyampur and Nainan form another cluster of census towns closeby in the Magrahat II CD block.

== Demographics ==
According to the 2011 Census of India, Bilandapur had a total population of 6,330, of which 3,164 (50%) were males and 3,166 (50%) were females. There were 907 persons in the age range of 0–6 years. The total number of literate persons was 4,173 (76.95% of the population over 6 years).

According to the 2001 Census of India, Bilandapur had a population of 5,722. Males constitute 51% of the population and females 49%. It has an average literacy rate of 48%, lower than the national average of 59.5%; with male literacy of 54% and female literacy of 43%. 18% of the population is under 6 years of age.

== Infrastructure ==
According to the District Census Handbook 2011, Bilandapur covered an area of 0.45 km^{2}. Among the civic amenities, it had 6.5 km roads with open drains, the protected water supply involved overhead tank. It had 290 domestic electric connections. Among the medical facilities it had 1 dispensary/ health centre, 1 family welfare centre, 2 maternity and child welfare centres, 1 veterinary hospital, 3 charitable hospitals/ nursing homes and 10 medicine shops. Among the educational facilities it had were 2 primary schools, the nearest middle, secondary, senior secondary schools, general degree college at Magrahat 1 km away. It had the branch of 1 nationalised bank.

== Transport ==
Magra Hat railway station is located nearby.

== Healthcare ==
Magrahat Rural Hospital, with 30 beds, at Magrahat, is the major government medical facility in the Magrahat II CD block.
