= Baribhanga Abad =

- Village
- Location in West Bengal Location in India
- Coordinates: 22.0367°N 88.4454°E
- Country: India
- State: West Bengal
- District: South 24 Parganas
- CD block: Mathurapur II

Area
  - Total: 10.09 km^{2} (3.90 sq mi)
- Elevation: 7 m (23 ft)

Population (2011)
  - Total: 6,773
  - Density: 671.3/km^{2} (1,739/sq mi)

Languages
  - Official: Bengali
  - Additional official: English
- Time zone: UTC+5:30 (IST)
- PIN: 743383
- Telephone code: +91 3174
- Vehicle registration: WB-19 to WB-22, WB-95 to WB-99
- Lok Sabha constituency: Mathurapur (SC)
- Vidhan Sabha constituency: Raidighi
- Website: www.s24pgs.gov.in

Baribhanga Abad is a village within the jurisdiction of the Raidighi police station in the Mathurapur II CD block in the Diamond Harbour subdivision of the South 24 Parganas district in the Indian state of West Bengal.

== Geography ==
Cities and towns in the eastern part of Diamond Harbour subdivision (including Magrahat I & II, Mandirbazar, Mathurapur I & II CD blocks) in South 24 Parganas district
M: municipal city/ town, CT: census town, R: rural/ urban centre, N: neighbourhood, T: religious centre
Owing to space constraints in the small map, the actual locations in a larger map may vary slightly

=== Area overview ===
Diamond Harbour subdivision is a rural subdivision with patches of urbanization. Only 14.61% of the population lives in the urban areas and an overwhelming 85.39% lives in the rural areas. In the eastern portion of the subdivision (shown in the map alongside) there are 24 census towns. The entire district is situated in the Ganges Delta and the eastern part of the district is a flat plain area with small towns, many in clusters. Location of places in the larger map varies a little. It is an OpenStreetMap, while we are using coordinates as in Google Maps.

Note: The map alongside presents some of the notable locations in the subdivision. All places marked in the map are linked in the larger full screen map.

=== Location ===
Baribhanga Abad is located at 22.0367°N 88.4454°E.

== Demographics ==
According to the 2011 Census of India, Baribhanga Abad had a total population of 6,773, of which 3,482 (51%) were males and 3,291 (49%) were females. There were 806 persons in the age range of 0–6 years. The total number of literate persons in Baribhanga Abad was 4,302 (72.10% of the population over 6 years).

== Civic administration ==
=== CD block HQ ===
The headquarters of the Mathurapur II CD block are located at Baribhanga Abad.

== Transport ==
Bishnupur-Raidighi Road links Baribhanga Abad to the State Highway 1.

Mathurapur Road railway station is located nearby.

== Healthcare ==
There is a primary health centre at Baribhanga Abad, with 6 beds.
