= Dhamua =

- Census Town
- Location in West Bengal Location in India
- Coordinates: 22.2875°N 88.3962°E
- Country: India
- State: West Bengal
- District: South 24 Parganas
- CD block: Magrahat II

Area
  - Total: 4.53 km^{2} (1.75 sq mi)
- Elevation: 8 m (26 ft)

Population (2011)
  - Total: 10,055
  - Density: 2,220/km^{2} (5,750/sq mi)

Languages
  - Official: Bengali
  - Additional official: English
- Time zone: UTC+5:30 (IST)
- PIN: 743610
- Telephone code: +91 3174
- Vehicle registration: WB-19 to WB-22, WB-95 to WB-99
- Lok Sabha constituency: Jaynagar (SC)
- Vidhan Sabha constituency: Magrahat Purba (SC)
- Website: www.s24pgs.gov.in

Dhamua is a census town and a gram panchayat within the jurisdiction of the Magrahat police station in the Magrahat II CD block in the Diamond Harbour subdivision of the South 24 Parganas district in the Indian state of West Bengal.

== Geography ==
Cities and towns in the eastern part of Diamond Harbour subdivision (including Magrahat I & II, Mandirbazar, Mathurapur I & II CD blocks) in South 24 Parganas district
M: municipal city/ town, CT: census town, R: rural/ urban centre, N: neighbourhood, T: religious centre
Owing to space constraints in the small map, the actual locations in a larger map may vary slightly

=== Area overview ===
Diamond Harbour subdivision is a rural subdivision with patches of urbanization. Only 14.61% of the population lives in the urban areas and an overwhelming 85.39% lives in the rural areas. In the eastern portion of the subdivision (shown in the map alongside) there are 24 census towns. The entire district is situated in the Ganges Delta and the eastern part of the district is a flat plain area with small towns, many in clusters. Location of places in the larger map varies a little. It is an OpenStreetMap, while we are using coordinates as in Google Maps.

Note: The map alongside presents some of the notable locations in the subdivision. All places marked in the map are linked in the larger full screen map.

=== Location ===
Dhamua is located at 22.2875°N 88.3962°E

Uttar Kalas, Dihi Kalas, Swangrampur and after a small gap Magrahat and Bilandapur form a cluster of census towns in the south-east corner of the Magrahat II CD block, as per the map of the Magrahat II CD block in the District Census Handbook for the South 24 Parganas. Dhamua, Shyampur and Nainan form another cluster of census towns closeby in the Magrahat II CD block.

== Demographics ==
According to the 2011 Census of India, Dhamua had a total population of 10,055 of which 5,166 (51%) were males and 4,889 (49%) were females. There were 1,110 persons in the age range of 0–6 years. The total number of literate persons in Dhamua was 6,988 (78.12% of the population over 6 years).

== Infrastructure ==
According to the District Census Handbook 2011, Dhamua covered an area of 4.5279 km^{2}. Among the civic amenities, it had 21 km roads, the protected water supply involved overhead tank. It had 1,623 domestic electric connections. Among the medical facilities it had 2 maternity and child welfare centres. Among the educational facilities it had were 5 primary schools, 1 middle school, 1 secondary school, the nearest senior secondary school at Moukhali 1 km away, the nearest general degree college at Baruipur 16 km away. Among the social, recreational and cultural facilities it had 1 public library, 1 reading room. Three important commodities it produced were: silver ornaments, zari saris and surgical instruments. It had the branch offices of 1 nationalised bank and 1 private commercial bank.

== Transport ==
Sasanka Sekhar Manna Road links Dhamua to the State Highway 1. The Sirakol-Sherpur Road and Sherpur Dhamua Road links it to the National Highway 12. The Dhamua-Magrahat Road links it to Magrahat.

Dhamua railway station is on the Sealdah–Diamond Harbour line of the Kolkata Suburban Railway system.

=== Commuters ===
With the electrification of the railways, suburban traffic has grown tremendously since the 1960s. As of 2005-06, more than 1.7 million (17 lakhs) commuters use the Kolkata Suburban Railway system daily. After the partition of India, refugees from erstwhile East Pakistan and Bangladesh had a strong impact on the development of urban areas in the periphery of Kolkata. The new immigrants depended on Kolkata for their livelihood, thus increasing the number of commuters. Eastern Railway runs 1,272 EMU trains daily.

== Education ==
Alida Bagnar High School is a Bengali-medium coeducational school established in 1950. It has facilities for teaching from class VI to class XII.

Dhamua Balika Vidyalaya is a Bengali-medium girls only school established in 1964. It has facilities for teaching from class VI to class XII.

== Healthcare ==
Magrahat Rural Hospital, with 30 beds, at Magrahat, is the major government medical facility in the Magrahat II CD block.
