= Swangrampur =

- Census Town
- Location in West Bengal Location in India
- Coordinates: 22.2393°N 88.3545°E
- Country: India
- State: West Bengal
- District: South 24 Parganas
- CD block: Magrahat II

Area
  - Total: 0.97 km^{2} (0.37 sq mi)
- Elevation: 8 m (26 ft)

Population (2011)
  - Total: 5,699
  - Density: 5,900/km^{2} (15,000/sq mi)

Languages
  - Official: Bengali
  - Additional official: English
- Time zone: UTC+5:30 (IST)
- PIN: 743355
- Telephone code: +91 3174
- Vehicle registration: WB-19 to WB-22, WB-95 to WB-99
- Lok Sabha constituency: Jaynagar (SC)
- Vidhan Sabha constituency: Magrahat Purba (SC)
- Website: www.s24pgs.gov.in

Swangrampur is a census town within the jurisdiction of the Magrahat police station in the Magrahat II CD block in the Diamond Harbour subdivision of the South 24 Parganas district in the Indian state of West Bengal.

== Geography ==
Cities and towns in the eastern part of Diamond Harbour subdivision (including Magrahat I & II, Mandirbazar, Mathurapur I & II CD blocks) in South 24 Parganas district
M: municipal city/ town, CT: census town, R: rural/ urban centre, N: neighbourhood, T: religious centre
Owing to space constraints in the small map, the actual locations in a larger map may vary slightly

=== Area overview ===
Diamond Harbour subdivision is a rural subdivision with patches of urbanization. Only 14.61% of the population lives in the urban areas and an overwhelming 85.39% lives in the rural areas. In the eastern portion of the subdivision (shown in the map alongside) there are 24 census towns. The entire district is situated in the Ganges Delta and the eastern part of the district is a flat plain area with small towns, many in clusters. Location of places in the larger map varies a little. It is an OpenStreetMap, while we are using coordinates as in Google Maps.

Note: The map alongside presents some of the notable locations in the subdivision. All places marked in the map are linked in the larger full screen map.

=== Location ===
Swangarmpur is located at 22.2393°N 88.3545°E

Uttar Kalas, Dihi Kalas, Swangrampur and after a small gap Magrahat and Bilandapur form a cluster of census towns in the south-east corner of the Magrahat II CD block, as per the map of the Magrahat II CD block in the District Census Handbook for the South 24 Parganas. Dhamua, Shyampur and Nainan form another cluster of census towns closeby in the Magrahat II CD block.

== Demographics ==
According to the 2011 Census of India, Swangrampur had a total population of 5,699 of which 2,918 (51%) were males and 2,781 (49%) were females. There were 901 persons in the age range of 0–6 years. The total number of literate people in Swangrampur was 5,699 (67.22% of the population over 6 years).

== Infrastructure ==
According to the District Census Handbook 2011, Swangrampur covered an area of 0.9729 km^{2}. Among the civic amenities, it had 17 km roads with open drains, the protected water supply involved overhead tank. It had 293 domestic electric connections. Among the medical facilities it had 1 maternity and child welfare centre, a dispensary/ health centre 1 km away, a family welfare centre 1 km away, a maternity home 1 km away, a veterinary hospital 1 km away and 5 medicine shops in the town. Among the educational facilities it had were 3 primary schools, the nearest secondary, senior secondary school, general degree college at Magrahat 1.5 km away. An important commodity it produced was embroidery work. It had the branch of a nationalised bank.

== Transport ==
Bahirpuya Halt railway station is located nearby.

== Healthcare ==
Magrahat Rural Hospital, with 30 beds, at Magrahat, is the major government medical facility in the Magrahat II CD block.
