= Jatar Deul =

Temple in West Bengal, India

- An ASI Listed Monument
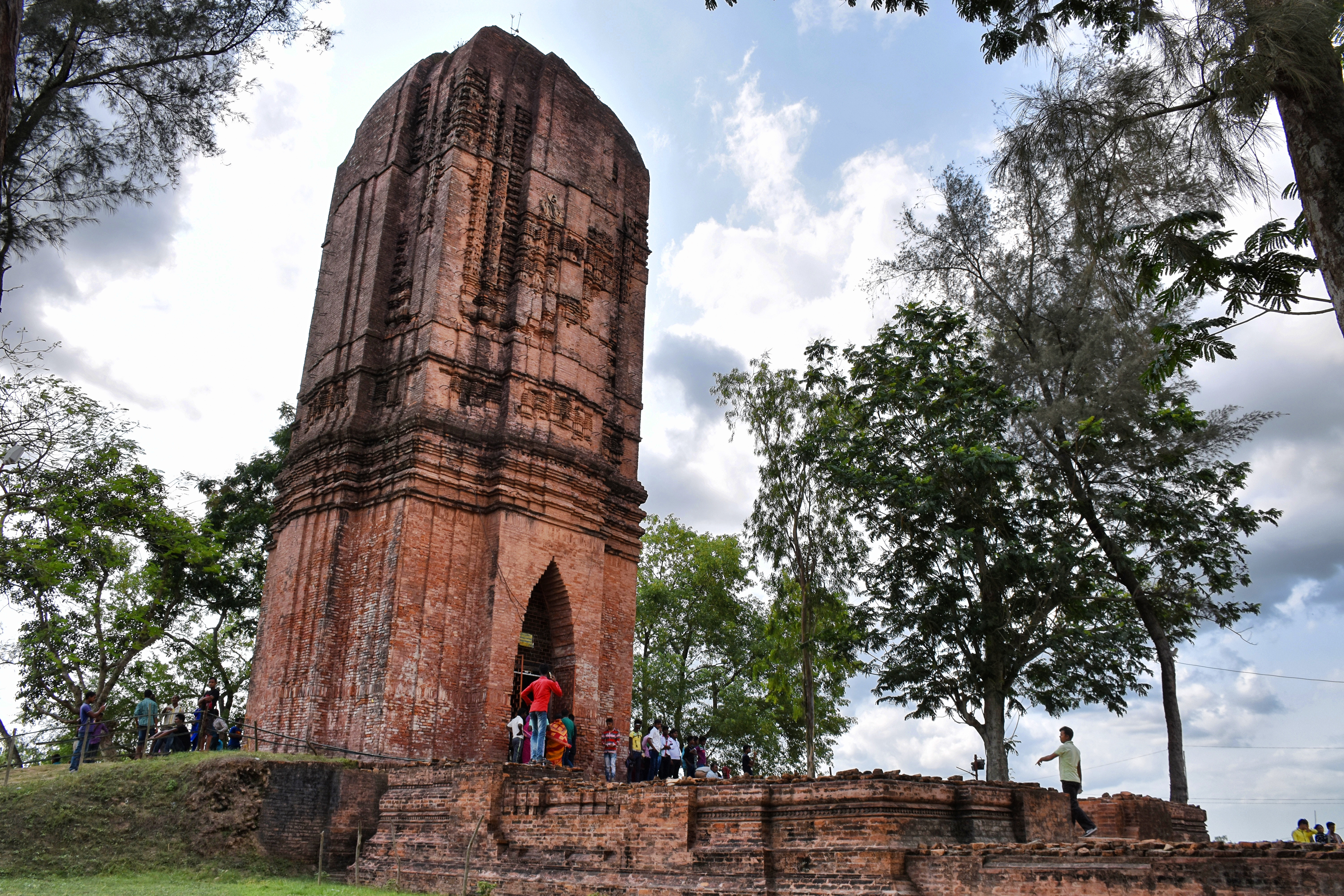

- Location in West Bengal Location in India

Religion
- Affiliation: Hinduism
- Deity: Shiva

Location
- Location: Kankan Dighi/Jata; South 24 Parganas
- State: West Bengal
- Country: India
- Coordinates: 21°59′33″N 88°29′15″E

Architecture
- Type: Rekha deul
- Established: 10th -11th century
- Completed: 10th -11th century
- Elevation: 30 m (98 ft)

Jatar Deul is located in district South 24 Parganas of the Indian state West Bengal. This is a brick temple and is datable between the 10th and 11th century on the basis of its architecture. However, this type of brick temple we can see at Nebia Khera, Uttar Pradesh.

== Location ==
The Jatar-Deul stands isolated near a village named jata (from which the name comes from) in the surroundings of the locality Kanakan Dighi, about 5 km east of the small town of Raidighi in the Mathurapur II community development block in the Diamond Harbour subdivision of the district of South 24 Parganas in West Bengal.

== History ==
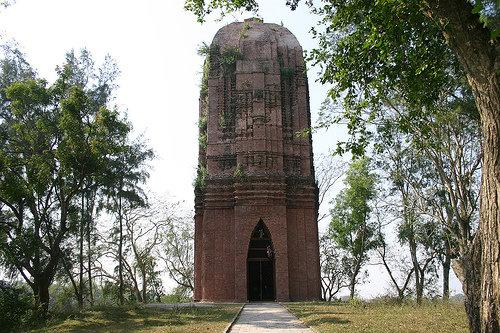
Jatar Deul

The temple is known by the name of "Jatar Deul ". This brick temple is traditionally connected with an inscription (not traceable now) of one Raja Jayantachandra, purported to have been issued in 975 CE. It was probably dedicated to Mahadev or Siva, who also goes by the name of Jatadhari. The Archaeological Department board at the temple site places establishment around 11th century. However, there was no deity inside the temple. The discovery of Jatar Deul dates back to the middle of the nineteenth century, when land surveyors stumbled upon a towering brick structure in the midst of the Sundarban.

== Consecration ==
What purpose it served is now a matter of conjecture. There is neither a cult nor any other sculptural or inscriptional evidence available, it is also the consecration of the temple is unclear – some believe it was originally for a Buddhist structure; others see it as a building in honor of the Hindu God Shiva (Mahadev).

== Architecture ==
It towers nearly 100 ft. above the plain. The entrance which is on the east is 9.5 ft. wide and is spanned by a pointed arch. The inside is about 10 ft. square and the walls are about 10 ft. thick. No plinth is visible and the floor is some six feet below the ground, and is reached by a flight of steps.

According to the List of Monuments of National Importance in West Bengal Jatar Deul is an ASI listed monument.
