= Pratima Mondal =

Indian politician (born 1966)

Member of Parliament, Lok Sabha
- Incumbent
- Assumed office 16 May 2014
- Preceded by: Tarun Mandal
- Constituency: Jaynagar

Personal details
- Born: 16 February 1966 (age 60) Gourdaha, Canning West Bengal, India
- Citizenship: India
- Party: Trinamool Congress
- Spouse: Narayan Chandra Mondal
- Children: 1 Son & 1 Daughter
- Parents: Gobinda Chandra Naskar (father); Uma Naskar (mother)
- Education: M.A., B.Ed.
- Alma mater: University of Calcutta
- Occupation: Politician
- Profession: WBCS Officer

Pratima Mondal (née Naskar; born 16 February 1966) is an Indian politician who has been a Member of Parliament for Jaynagar since 2014. Before she joined politics she was a WBCS officer. Her father Gobinda Chandra Naskar was also a former MP from Bangaon. She belongs to the Trinamool Congress.

== Personal life ==
Pratima Mondal was born on 16 February 1966, to a Bengali Hindu family in Gourdaha, Canning in South 24 Parganas. She is daughter of the former Member of Parliament, Gobinda Chandra Naskar. Pratima Mondal is a postgraduate of the University of Calcutta. She was a WBCS officer before entering politics.

== Political career ==
In the 2014 Lok Sabha election, the All India Trinamool Congress nominated Pratima Mondal from the Jaynagar Lok Sabha constituency. She was elected with 4,94,746 votes, which was 41.71% of the votes cast. She defeated her nearest rival Subhas Naskar of the Revolutionary Socialist Party by 1,08,384 votes.

=== 2026 MPs Rebellion ===
Following the 2026 Assembly Elections, 20 out of the 28 Members of Parliament from Trinamool Congress decided to leave Mamata Banerjee and the Trinamool Congress. They formed a new group and decided to merge with a relatively little known National Party, the Nationalist Citizen Party of India and presented a representation in this regards to Lok Sabha Speaker Om Birla on 14 June 2026.

After this major split in the Trinamool Congress, only 8 Lok Sabha MPs remained loyal to Mamata Banerjee. The loyalist MPs included Abhishek Banerjee, Mahua Moitra, Sougata Roy, Kalyan Banerjee, Kirti Azad, Pratima Mondal and Sajda Ahmed.

The event is still unfolding.
