= Tapas Mondal =

Indian politician (born 1961)

Tapas Mondal (born 1961) is an Indian politician from West Bengal. He is a member of the West Bengal Legislative Assembly from the Raidighi Assembly constituency in South 24 Parganas district representing the All India Trinamool Congress.

== Early life and education ==
Mondal is from Raidighi, South 24 Parganas district, West Bengal. He is the son of Shibprasad Mondal. He completed his Master of Arts in Bengali at University of Calcutta in the year 1993. He and his wife are teachers. He declared assets worth Rs.32 lakhs in his affidavit to the Election Commission of India.

== Career ==
Mondal won the Raidighi Assembly constituency representing the All India Trinamool Congress in the 2026 West Bengal Legislative Assembly election. He polled 1,18,991 votes and defeated his nearest rival, Palash Rana of the Bharatiya Janata Party, by a margin of 5,957 votes.
