= Magrahat =

- Census Town
- Location in West Bengal Location in India
- Coordinates: 22.2420°N 88.3784°E
- Country: India
- State: West Bengal
- District: South 24 Parganas
- CD block: Magrahat II

Area
  - Total: 3.02 km^{2} (1.17 sq mi)
- Elevation: 8 m (26 ft)

Population (2011)
  - Total: 17,392
  - Density: 5,760/km^{2} (14,900/sq mi)

Languages
  - Official: Bengali
  - Additional official: English
- Time zone: UTC+5:30 (IST)
- PIN: 743355
- Telephone code: +91 3174
- Vehicle registration: WB-19 to WB-22, WB-95 to WB-99
- Lok Sabha constituency: Jaynagar (SC)
- Vidhan Sabha constituency: Magrahat Purba (SC), Magrahat Paschim
- Website: www.s24pgs.gov.in

Magrahat is a census town and a gram panchayat within the jurisdiction of the Magrahat police station in the Magrahat II CD block in the Diamond Harbour subdivision of the South 24 Parganas district in the Indian state of West Bengal.

== Geography ==
Cities and towns in the eastern part of Diamond Harbour subdivision (including Magrahat I & II, Mandirbazar, Mathurapur I & II CD blocks) in South 24 Parganas district
M: municipal city/ town, CT: census town, R: rural/ urban centre, N: neighbourhood, T: religious centre
Owing to space constraints in the small map, the actual locations in a larger map may vary slightly

=== Area overview ===
Diamond Harbour subdivision is a rural subdivision with patches of urbanization. Only 14.61% of the population lives in the urban areas and an overwhelming 85.39% lives in the rural areas. In the eastern portion of the subdivision (shown in the map alongside) there are 24 census towns. The entire district is situated in the Ganges Delta and the eastern part of the district is a flat plain area with small towns, many in clusters. Location of places in the larger map varies a little. It is an OpenStreetMap, while we are using coordinates as in Google Maps.

Note: The map alongside presents some of the notable locations in the subdivision. All places marked in the map are linked in the larger full screen map.

=== Location ===
Magrahat is located at 22.2420°N 88.3784°E. It has an average elevation of 8 metres (26 ft).

Uttar Kalas, Dihi Kalas, Swangrampur and after a small gap Magrahat and Bilandapur form a cluster of census towns in the south-east corner of the Magrahat II CD block, as per the map of the Magrahat II CD block in the District Census Handbook for the South 24 Parganas. Dhamua, Shyampur and Nainan form another cluster of census towns closeby in the Magrahat II CD block.

== Demographics ==
According to the 2011 Census of India, Magrahat had a total population of 17,392, of which 8,643 (50%) were males and 8,749 (50%) were females. There were 2,264 persons in the age range of 0–6 years. The total number of literates in Magrahat was 11,259 (74.40% of the population over 6 years).

== Civic administration ==
=== Police station ===
Magrahat police station covers an area of 135.184 sq km. It has jurisdiction over the Magrahat II CD block.

=== CD block HQ ===
The headquarters of the Magrahat II CD block are located at Magrahat.

== Infrastructure ==
According to the District Census Handbook 2011, Magrahat covered an area of 3.021 km^{2}. Among the civic amenities, it had 12 km roads with open drains, the protected water supply involved overhead tank. It had 310 domestic electric connections. Among the educational facilities it had were 7 primary schools, 1 middle school, 2 secondary schools, 1 senior secondary school, 1 general degree college. It had 1 recognised shorthand, typewriting and vocational training institution. Among the social, recreational and cultural facilities it had 1 cinema theatre. An important commodity it produced was embroidery work. It had the branch of 1 nationalised bank.

== Social scenario ==
According to the District Human Development Report for the South 24 Parganas, “The district is typically at the lower rung of the ladder in terms of district per capita income compared to other districts of West Bengal… This place also houses the largest proportion of backward people compared to the state… So far as the crime scenario is concerned the economically weaker group, i.e. the women and children, suffer the most in this district.”

== Transport ==
Magrahat is on the Usthi-Magrahat-Dakshin Barasat Road.

Magra Hat railway station is on the Sealdah–Diamond Harbour line of the Kolkata Suburban Railway system.

=== Commuters ===
With the electrification of the railways, suburban traffic has grown tremendously since the 1960s. As of 2005-06, more than 1.7 million (17 lakhs) commuters use the Kolkata Suburban Railway system daily. After the partition of India, refugees from erstwhile East Pakistan and Bangladesh had a strong impact on the development of urban areas in the periphery of Kolkata. The new immigrants depended on Kolkata for their livelihood, thus increasing the number of commuters. Eastern Railway runs 1,272 EMU trains daily.

== Education ==
Magrahat College, established in 1996, is affiliated with the University of Calcutta. It offers honours courses in Bengali, English, education, history, geography and political science, and a general course in arts.

== Healthcare ==
Magrahat Rural Hospital, with 30 beds, at Magrahat, is the major government medical facility in the Magrahat II CD block.
