= Paresh Nath Kayal =

Indian politician (born 1926)

Member of Parliament, Lok Sabha
- In office 1952–1967
- Succeeded by: Chitta Roy
- Constituency: Jaynagar, West Bengal

Personal details
- Born: 1 October 1926 Jaynagar Majilpur, Bengal Presidency, British India
- Party: Indian National Congress
- Spouse: Santi Prabha Kayal

Paresh Nath Kayal (born 1 October 1926, date of death unknown) was an Indian politician. He was elected from Jaynagar, West Bengal to the Lok Sabha, lower house of the Parliament of India as a member of the Indian National Congress. Kayal is deceased.
