= Sakti Kumar Sarkar =

Indian politician (1930–2000)

Member of Parliament, Lok Sabha
- In office 1971–1980
- Preceded by: Chitta Roy
- Succeeded by: Sanat Kumar Mandal
- Constituency: Jaynagar, West Bengal

Personal details
- Born: 1930 Jaynagar Majilpur, Bengal Presidency, British India
- Died: 7 January 2000 (aged 70) Calcutta, West Bengal, India
- Party: Janata Party

Sakti Kumar Sarkar (1930 – 7 January 2000) was an Indian politician belonging to the Janata Party and was elected from Jaynagar, West Bengal to the Lok Sabha, lower house of the Parliament of India. Sarkar died in Calcutta, West Bengal on 7 January 2000, at the age of 70.
