= Aloke Jaldata =

Indian politician

Aloke Jaldata (born 1967) is an Indian politician from West Bengal. He is a member of the West Bengal Legislative Assembly from Raidighi Assembly constituency in South 24 Parganas district. He won the 2021 West Bengal Legislative Assembly election representing the All India Trinamool Congress party.

== Early life and education ==
Jaldata is from Raidighi, South 24 Parganas district, West Bengal. He is the son of late Kalipada Jaldata. He completed his MBBS at University of Calcutta and passed the examinations by West Bengal Medical Council in 1999. His wife is also a doctor and works as a government medical practitioner at BR Singh Hospital under Eastern Railway.

== Career ==
Jaldata won from Raidighi Assembly constituency representing the All India Trinamool Congress in the 2021 West Bengal Legislative Assembly election. He polled 115,707 votes and defeated his nearest rival, Santanu Bapuli of the Bharatiya Janata Party, by a margin of 35,568 votes.
