= Basanti Assembly constituency =

West Bengal Legislative Assembly constituency

Basanti
- Constituency No. 128 for the West Bengal Legislative Assembly
- Interactive Map Outlining Basanti Assembly Constituency

Constituency details
- Country: India
- Region: East India
- State: West Bengal
- District: South 24 Parganas
- Lok Sabha constituency: Jaynagar
- Established: 1962
- Total electors: 260,618
- Reservation: SC

Member of Legislative Assembly
- 18th West Bengal Legislative Assembly
- Incumbent Nilima Mistry
- Party: DTC
- Alliance: DTC+
- Elected year: 2026

Basanti Assembly constituency is a Legislative Assembly constituency of South 24 Parganas district in the Indian State of West Bengal. It is reserved for Scheduled Castes.

== Overview ==
As per order of the Delimitation Commission in respect of the Delimitation of constituencies in the West Bengal, Basanti Assembly constituency is composed of the following:

- Amjhara, Basanti, Bharatgarh, Charabidya, Foolmalancha, Jharkhali, Jyotishpur, Kanthalberia, Nafarganj, Ramchandrakhali and Uttar Mokamberia gram panchayats of Basanti community development block
- Atharobanki gram panchayat of Canning II community development block

Basanti Assembly constituency is a part of No. 19 Jaynagar Lok Sabha constituency.

== Members of the Legislative Assembly ==
Year	Name	Party
1962	Shakila Khatun	Indian National Congress
1967	Shakila Khatun	Indian National Congress
1969	Ashok Chaudhury	Revolutionary Socialist Party
1971	Panchanan Sinha	Indian National Congress
1972	Panchanan Sinha	Indian National Congress
1977	Kalipada Burman	Revolutionary Socialist Party
1982	Subhas Naskar	Revolutionary Socialist Party
1987	Subhas Naskar	Revolutionary Socialist Party
1991	Subhas Naskar	Revolutionary Socialist Party
1996	Subhas Naskar	Revolutionary Socialist Party
2001	Subhas Naskar	Revolutionary Socialist Party
2006	Subhas Naskar	Revolutionary Socialist Party
2011	Subhas Naskar	Revolutionary Socialist Party
2016	Gobinda Chandra Naskar	Trinamool Congress
2021	Shyamal Mondal	Trinamool Congress
2026	Nilima Mistry	Trinamool Congress

== Election results ==
=== 2026 ===
2026 West Bengal Legislative Assembly election: Basanti
Party	Candidate	Votes	%	±%
AITC	Nilima Mistry	127,495	54.99	▲2.89
BJP	Bikash Sardar	71,314	30.76	▲2.33
Indian Secular Front	Asit Roy	25,924	11.18	New entry
RSP	Samar Biswas	2,099	0.91	▼16.24
NOTA	None of the above	1,402	0.6	▼0.29
Majority		56,181	24.23	▲0.56
Turnout		231,860	96.46	▲14.4
AITC hold		Swing		

=== 2021 ===
2021 West Bengal Legislative Assembly election: Basanti
Party	Candidate	Votes	%	±%
AITC	Shyamal Mondal	111,453	52.1	▲2.23
BJP	Ramesh Majhi	60,811	28.43	▲22.72
RSP	Subhas Naskar	36,688	17.15	▼23.57
NOTA	None of the above	1,907	0.89	
Majority		50,642	23.67	
Turnout		213,910	82.06	
AITC hold		Swing		

=== 2016 ===
2016 West Bengal Legislative Assembly election: Basanti
Party	Candidate	Votes	%	±%
AITC	Gobinda Chandra Naskar	90,522	49.87	New entry
RSP	Subhas Naskar	73,915	40.72	▼8.35
BJP	Pankaj Roy	10,373	5.71	▲1.89
NOTA	None of the above	4,487	2.47	New entry
MPOI	Himanshu Kayal	1,141	0.63	New entry
Independent	Taranga Mondal	1,069	0.59	New entry
Majority		16,607	9.15	▲4.95
Turnout		1,81,507	80.61	▼0.63
AITC gain from RSP		Swing		

=== 2011 ===
2011 West Bengal Legislative Assembly election: Basanti
Party	Candidate	Votes	%	±%
RSP	Subhas Naskar	72,772	49.07	
INC	Arnab Roy	66,636	44.87	
BJP	Amal Kanti Roy	5,676	3.82	
PDCI	Samir Das	3,333	2.24	
Majority		6,136	4.20	
Turnout		1,48,516	81.24	
RSP hold		Swing		

=== 1977-2006 ===
Subhas Naskar of RSP won the Basanti Assembly constituency from 1982 to 2006, defeating Amal Kanti Roy of BJP in 2006, Jayanta Sarkar of AITC in 2001 and 1996, Bipin Behari Sardar of INC in 1991 and 1987, and Jnanendranath Majumdar of INC in 1982. Kalipada Barman of RSP defeated Chittaranjan Naskar of INC in 1977.

=== 1962-1972 ===
Panchanan Sinha of INC won in 1972 and 1971. Ashok Chaudhuri of RSP won in 1969. Shakila Khatun of INC won in 1967 and 1962. The seat did not exist prior to that.
