= Sanat Kumar Mandal =

Indian politician (born 1942)

Member of the Indian Parliament for Jaynagar
- In office 1980–2009
- Preceded by: Sakti Kumar Sarkar
- Succeeded by: Tarun Mandal

Personal details
- Born: 14 February 1942 (age 84) Jaynagar Majilpur, Bengal Presidency, British India
- Party: Revolutionary Socialist Party
- Spouse: Anita Mandal (Roy)
- As of 17 September, 2006

Sanat Kumar Mandal (born 14 February 1942) is an Indian politician and a leader of the Revolutionary Socialist Party (RSP) political party. He was elected to 7th Lok Sabha in 1980 from Jaynagar constituency of West Bengal. He was re-elected to the Lok Sabha in 1984, 1989, 1991, 1996, 1998, 1999 and 2004 from the same constituency.
