= Tarun Mandal =

Indian politician

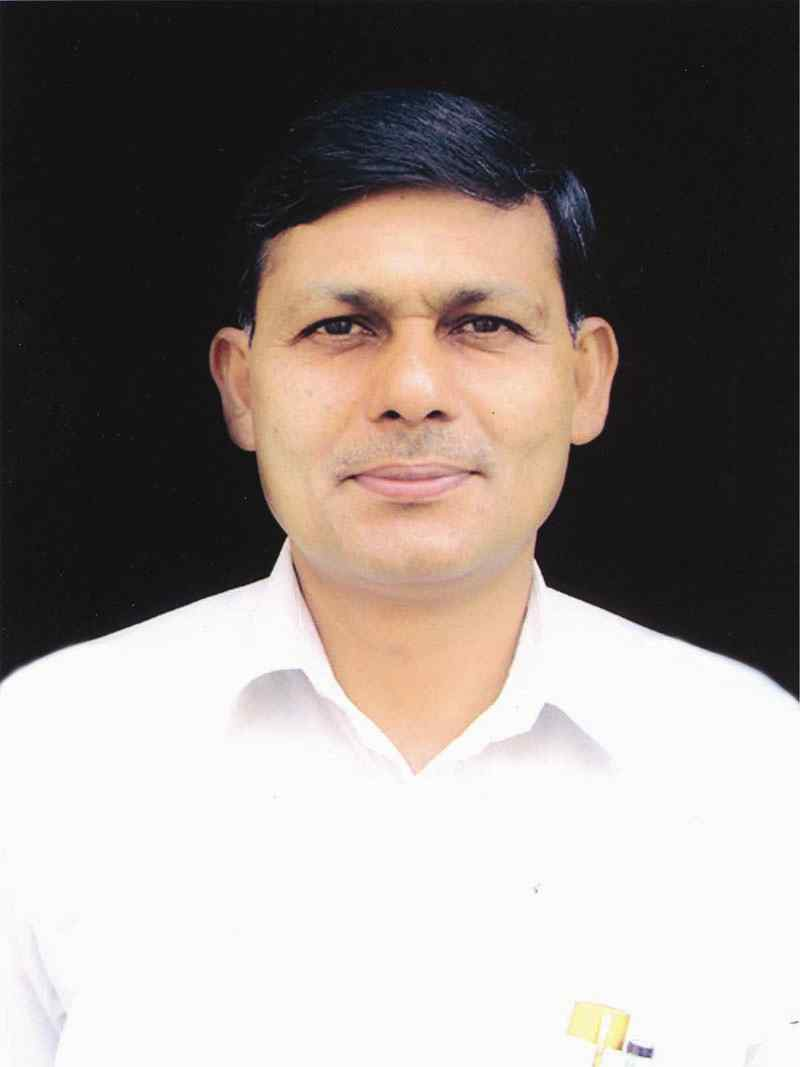

Member of Lok Sabha for Jaynagar
- In office 16 May 2009 — 16 May 2014
- Preceded by: Sanat Kumar Mandal
- Succeeded by: Pratima Mondal

Personal details
- Born: 20 January 1959 (age 67) Jaynagar Majilpur, South 24 Parganas, West Bengal, India
- Party: Socialist Unity Centre of India (Communist)
- Spouse: Mahua Nanda
- Education: MBBS, PGCCHM

Tarun Mandal is an Indian writer and politician, belonging to the Socialist Unity Centre of India (Communist). He was the MP representing Jaynagar (Lok Sabha constituency) of West Bengal in the 15th Lok Sabha. He contested as an independent candidate and defeated his nearest rival Nimai Barman of RSP by 53,676 votes, receiving 48.72% of the total votes polled. He is a medical doctor and a member of the Medical Service Centre.

== Books published ==
All in Bengali

- Maranphande Janswasthya
- Swasthya Bikshan
- Aamar Katha-on quotations of Saratchandra
- Saratchandra-Anupam Sailite Bhaswar Manisa
- Saratchandra-Manisa Saili Uttaradhikar
- Swasthya Aamar Adhikar
- Dr. Nani Guha - Manane Smarane.

== Literary, artistic, and scientific accomplishments ==
He has written articles on educational and cultural problems, public health awareness, diseases, disaster management programs related to health hazards, problems of healthcare delivery system of India and poetry published in journals.

== Social and cultural activities ==
Recitation, mass songs, participation in drama as actor, speech on socio-political-cultural issues and on life, works of renaissance personalities, freedom fighters, medical scientists and organised and participated in language, health and education movements.

== Special interests ==
1. Eradication of poverty, illiteracy, ill health, food crisis, housing problems, drinking water crisis of Indian population;
2. Facilitate people's movement towards change over of present society to an exploitation free socialist society; and (iii) listening to music

== Sports and clubs ==
Participated and represented college football and cricket teams, physical exercise.

== Other information ==
Junior Medical Officer (Er.) at Medical College, Hospital, Kolkatta, 1985–86; Medical Officer, CHS, 1986–90; Sr. Medical Officer, CHS, 1991–1995; Chief Medical Officers, CHS, 1996–2002; Chief Medical Officer (Selection Grade), ISPH, Nashik, 2002–07; Participated in disaster management works like rendered free medical services as member and leader of medical service centre, a socio-medical voluntary organisation different places for last 32 years i.e. West Bengal floods, Assam floods, Supercyclone Orissa, Kosi flood Bihar, Mumbai flood (2005), Baroda and Surat floods (2005–06), Tsunami, Andaman Nicobar Islands, Earthquake, Gujarat, Aila Cyclone, Sunderbans, West Bengal, Kolkata and Mumbai slums: Health movements organised for improvement of medical education, health care delivery system of West Bengal and India; participated in the people's resistance movement of Singur and Nandigram; and working for protection and upliftment of medical ethics and for propeople scientific health policies; Co-chairman, Vigilance and Monitoring Committee, South 24 PGS district.
