= Shakila Jalaluddin =

Indian politician

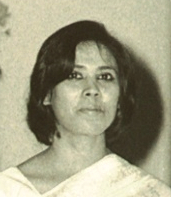
young shakila

Shakila Jalaluddin, a.k.a. Shakila Jalal (née Shakila Khatun) was a politician and Deputy Minister of Social Welfare in the Indian province of West Bengal. She was 24 years old when she entered the West Bengal Assembly after winning the election representing the Indian Congress Party in 1962 defeating Independent candidate Phonibhushan Mondal, making Jalaluddin the youngest female elected official in India. To present day, Jalaluddin holds the record for the largest number of votes in the Basanti constituency of West Bengal.

== Early political career ==
Jalaluddin was the daughter of politician and Deputy Minister of Agriculture of West Bengal, Abdus Shokur. After her father's sudden death in the Legislative Assembly in 1960, Indian Congress Party officials approached Shakila to replace him. Shakila won her first election by a 42,000-sympathy vote majority.

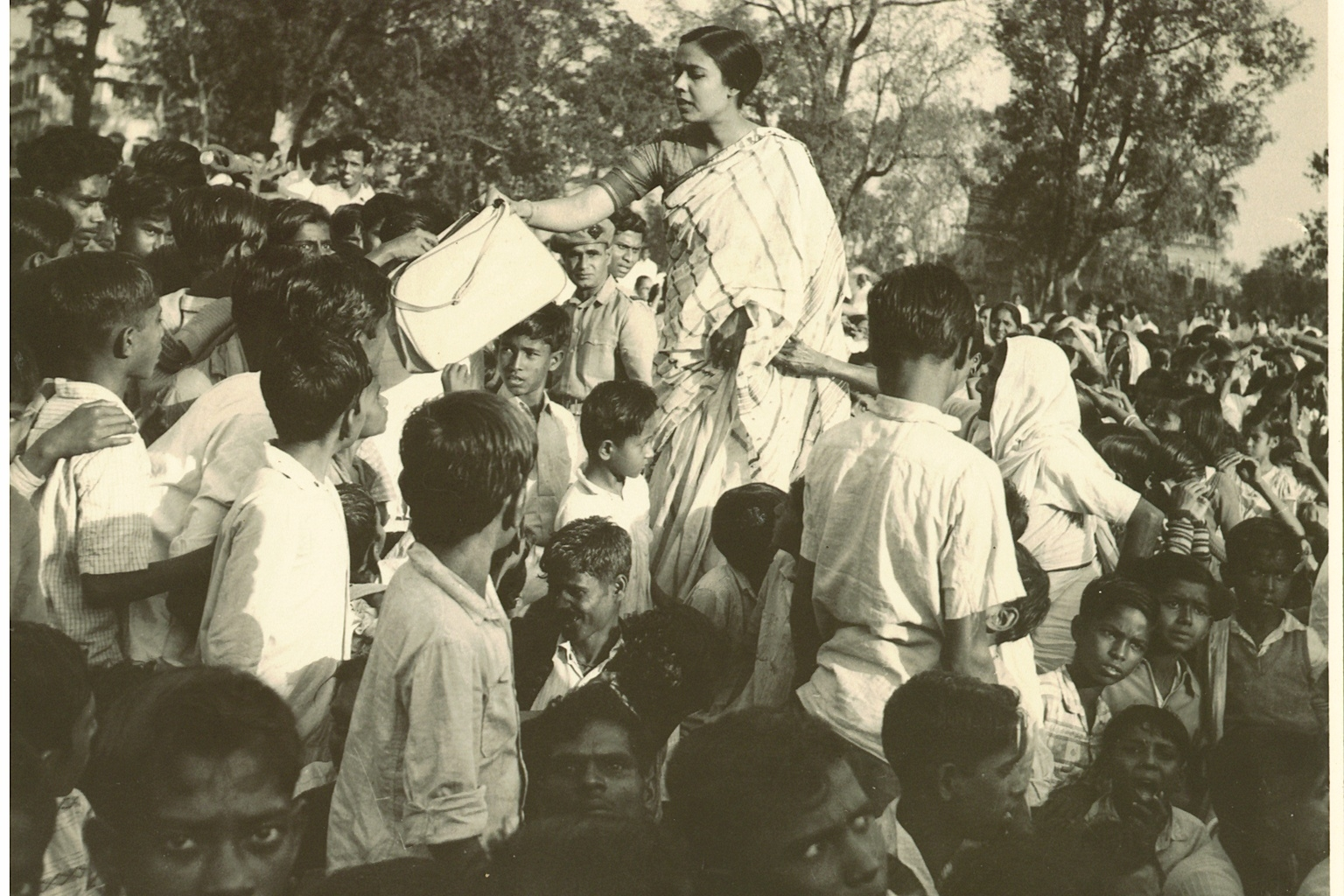

== Political accomplishments ==
Jalaluddin's ministerial duties were related to schooling, the establishment of rural health centers and battling over-population.

In her first term, she developed a statewide curriculum and provided guidance for implementing internationally recognized standards adopted by the Board of Education. In her second term, she directed funding for the construction of accessible clinics in every village within the constituency. She also legalized and promoted the Loop Device for birth control, mainly because of the low cost and lack of availability of the birth control pill.

Jalaluddin won two further elections in 1962, and 1967 prior to retiring from political life in 1968.

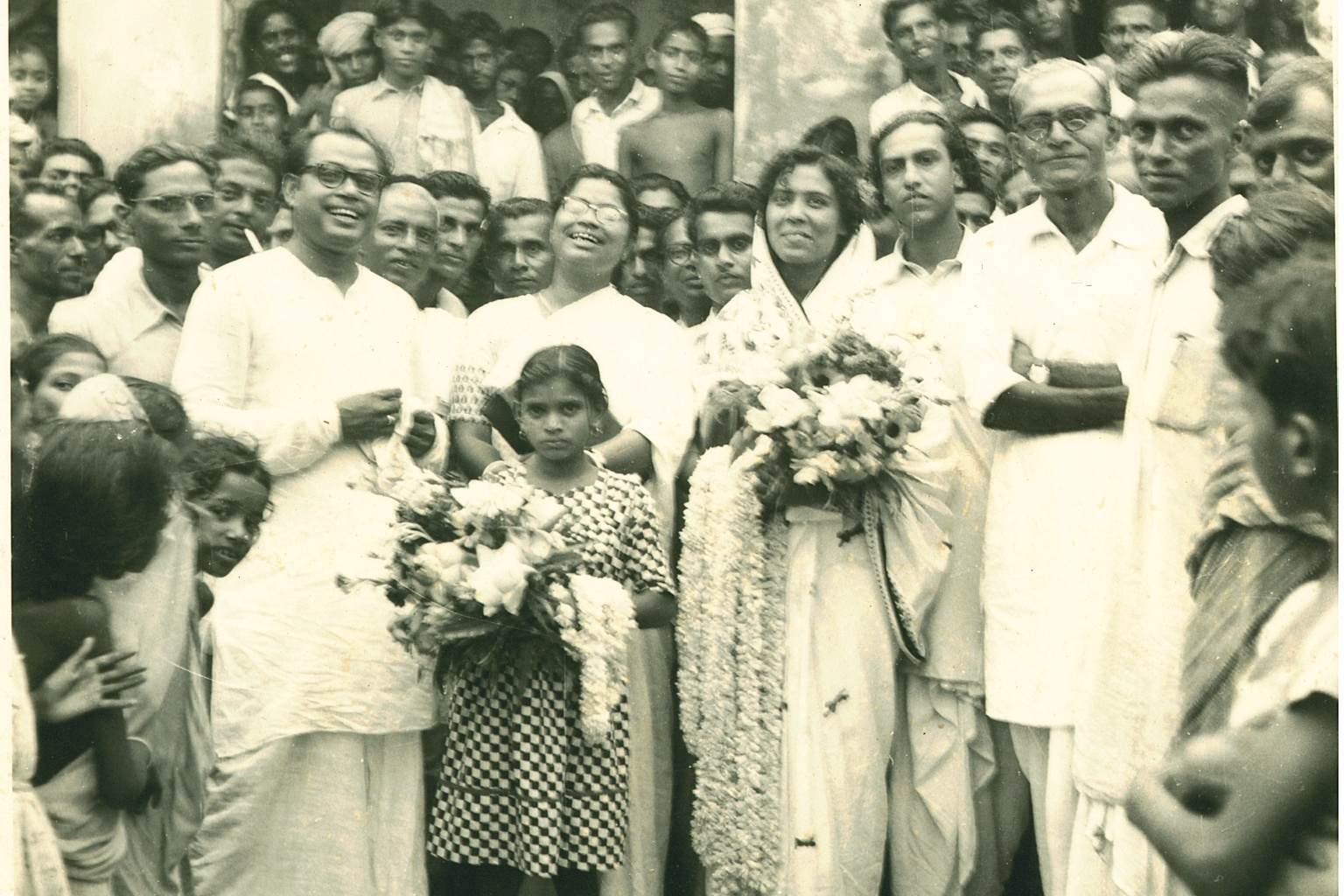

== Personal life ==
Jalaluddin was born in Malikpure, 24 South Parganas, West Bengal India on 5 July 1934. Her family home Ferhat Manzil, remains in Mallikpure today, 12 miles from Kolkata, India. She obtained her master's degree in International Affaires in 1959 from Lady Brabourne College (LBC) a women's college located in Kolkata.

In 1961, while appointed as Deputy Minister of Social Welfare, she was married to Jal Jalal at the Oberoi Grand Hotel in Kolkata. In 1969, Shakila and her husband immigrated to Canada, where she appeared in The Ottawa Journal and The Free Press Weekly after her arrival. During that time, she remained married for over 54 years, raised a family, and was an active member of various community organizations.

== Death ==
Shakila Jalaluddin died on 30 May 2015 in Ottawa, after sustaining head injuries from a fall at her home. She is survived by her husband Jal Jalal, her two children, Adam and Tania, as well as two grandchildren, Sabrina and Stephanie, all still living in various parts of Canada. Shakila is laid to rest at Beechwood, Canada's National Cemetery in Ottawa.

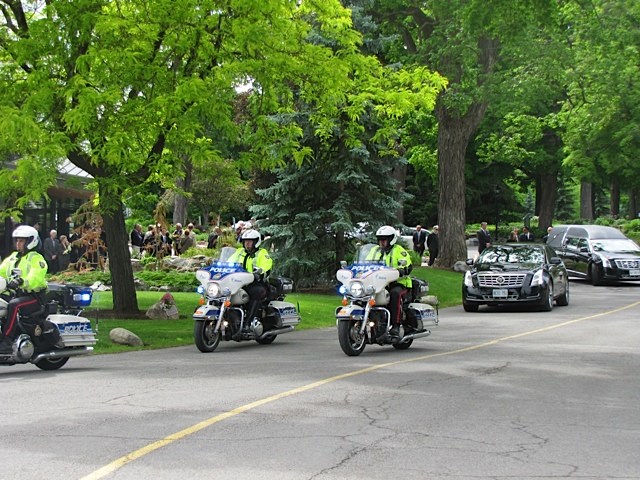
