= Namita Saha =

Indian politician

Member of the West Bengal Legislative Assembly
- In office May 2011 – 2026
- Preceded by: Bansari Mohan Kanji
- Succeeded by: Sarmistha Purkait
- Constituency: Magrahat Purba

Personal details
- Party: Trinamool Congress

Namita Saha is an Indian politician. She was elected to the West Bengal Legislative Assembly from Magrahat Purba as a member of the Trinamool Congress.
