= Mathurapur II =

Community Development Block in West Bengal, India

- Community Development Block
- Location of Mathurapur II community development block in South 24 Parganas district
- Coordinates: 22.1203°N 88.3943°E
- Country: India
- State: West Bengal
- Division: Presidency
- District: South 24 Parganas
- Subdivision: Diamond Harbour
- Headquarters: Baribhanga Abad

Government
  - Gram Panchayats: Dighirpar Bakultala, Gilarchhat, Kankandighi, Kasinagar, Kautala, Khari, Kumrapara, Nagendrapur, Nandakumarpur, Radhakantapur, Raidighi
  - Lok Sabha constituencies: Mathurapur
  - Vidhan Sabha constituencies: Raidighi

Area
  - Total: 227.45 km^{2} (87.82 sq mi)

Population (2011)
  - Total: 220,839
  - Density: 970.93/km^{2} (2,514.7/sq mi)

Demographics
  - Literacy: 77.77 per cent
  - Sex ratio: 940 ♂/♀

Languages
  - Official: Bengali
  - Additional official: English
- Time zone: UTC+05:30 (IST)
- Website: s24pgs.gov.in

Mathurapur II is a community development block that forms an administrative division in Diamond Harbour subdivision of South 24 Parganas district in the Indian state of West Bengal.

== Geography ==

Mathurapur II CD block is located at 22°07′13″N 88°23′39″E. It has an average elevation of 7 metres (23 ft).

Mathurapur II CD block is bounded by Mathurapur I CD block in the north and part of the west, Jaynagar II and Kultali CD blocks in the east, Sundarbans forests in the south and Patharpratima CD block in a part of the west.

South 24 Parganas district is divided into two distinct physiographic zones: the marine-riverine delta in the north and the marine delta zone in the south. As the sea receded southwards, in the sub-recent geological period, a large low-lying plain got exposed. Both tidal inflows and the rivers have been depositing sediments in this plain. The periodical collapse of both the natural levees and man-made embankments speed up the process of filling up of the depressions containing brackish water wetlands. The marine delta in the south is formed of interlacing tidal channels. As non-saline water for irrigation is scarce, agriculture is monsoon dominated. Some parts of the wetlands are still preserved for raising fish.

Mathurapur II CD block has an area of 227.45 km^{2}. It has 1 panchayat samity, 11 gram panchayats, 115 gram sansads (village councils), 27 mouzas and 27 inhabited villages, as per the District Statistical Handbook, South Twenty-four Parganas. Raidighi police station serves this CD Block. Headquarters of this CD block is at Baribhanga Abad.

Mathurapur II CD block has 225.46 km of embankments. Breaches in these embankments varied from 3.3 km in 2005-06 to 18.5 km in 2006-07. Embankments raised along rivers are of critical importance for the safety of lives and protection of crops, against daily tides and tidal surges. Technologically the embankment structures are weak and there is need of proper drainage of accumulated rain water through sluice gates. Crude cuts in embankments for drainage of accumulated rain water and channels built for providing water to large fisheries (bheris) also add to the hazards. Cyclones and tropical depressions are regular threats.

Gram panchayats of Mathurapur II CD block/panchayat samiti are: Dighirpar Bakultala, Gilarchhat, Kankandighi, Kasinagar, Kautala, Khari, Kumrapara, Nagendrapur, Nandakumarpur, Radhakantapur and Raidighi.

== Demographics ==
=== Population ===
As per the 2011 Census of India, Mathurapur II CD block had a total population of 220,839, all of which were rural. There were 113,831 (52%) males and 107,008 (48%) females. Population below 6 years was 26,447. Scheduled Castes numbered 62,342 (28.23%) and Scheduled Tribes numbered 4,643 (2.10%).

As per the 2001 Census of India, Mathurapur II CD block had a total population of 198,261, out of which 102,937 were males and 95,324 were females. Mathurapur II CD block registered a population growth of 14.61 per cent during the 1991-2001 decade. Decadal growth for South 24 Parganas district was 20.89 per cent. Decadal growth in West Bengal was 17.84 per cent. Scheduled Castes at 60,519 formed around one-third the population. Scheduled Tribes numbered 5,676.

Large villages (with 4,000+ population) in Mathurapur II CD block (2011 census figures in brackets): Khari (21,900), Uttar Kashinagar (12,321), Kautala (11,725), Gilarchat (25,897), Radhakantapur Abad (8,442), Baribhanga Abad (6,773), Raydighi Abad (20,467), Dighirpar Bakultala (14,080), Chaplarkhop (4,088), Kumarpara (17,682), Kankandighi (12,900), Paschim Jatardeul (5,797), Purbba Jatardeul (6,222), Baradanagar (4,715), Purbba Shridharpur (5,377), Nagendrapur (6,041), Damkal (5,936), Dakshin Jaykrishnapur (5,204), Nandakumarpur (5,570) and Mahabatpur (4,249).

=== Literacy ===
As per the 2011 census, the total number of literates in Mathurapur II CD block was 151,186 (77.77% of the population over 6 years) out of which males numbered 85,316 (85.09% of the male population over 6 years) and females numbered 65,870 (69.98% of the female population over 6 years). The gender disparity (the difference between female and male literacy rates) was 15.12%.

As per the 2011 Census of India, literacy in South 24 Parganas district was 77.51 Literacy in West Bengal was 77.08% in 2011. Literacy in India in 2011 was 74.04%.

As per the 2001 Census of India, Mathurapur II CD block had a total literacy of 68.24 per cent for the 6+ age group. While male literacy was 80.56 per cent female literacy was 54.89 per cent. South 24 Parganas district had a total literacy of 69.45 per cent, male literacy being 79.19 per cent and female literacy being 59.01 per cent.

See also – List of West Bengal districts ranked by literacy rate

Literacy in CD blocks of
South 24 Parganas district
Alipore Sadar subdivision
Bishnupur I – 78.33%
Bishnupur II – 81.37%
Budge Budge I – 80.57%
Budge Budge II – 79.13%
Thakurpukur Maheshtala – 83.54%
Baruipur subdivision
Baruipur – 76.46%
Bhangar I – 72.06%
Bhangar II – 74.49%
Jaynagar I – 73.17%
Jaynagar II – 69.71%
Kultali – 69.37%
Sonarpur – 79.70%
Canning subdivision
Basanti – 68.32%
Canning I – 70.76%
Canning II – 66.51%
Gosaba – 78.98%
Diamond Harbour subdivision
Diamond Harbour I – 75.72%
Diamond Harbour II – 76.91%
Falta – 77.17%
Kulpi – 75.49%
Magrahat I – 73.82%
Magrahat II – 77.41%
Mandirbazar – 75.89%
Mathurapur I – 73.93%
Mathurapur II – 77.77%
Kakdwip subdivision
Kakdwip – 77.93%
Namkhana – 85.72
Patharpratima – 82.11%
Sagar – 84.21%
Source: 2011 Census: CD Block Wise
Primary Census Abstract Data

=== Language ===
Languages of Mathurapur II CD block (2011)
1. Bengali (99.9%)
2. Hindi (0.03%)
3. Urdu (0.02%)
4. Others (0.01%)

At the time of the 2011 census, 99.94% of the population spoke Bengali, 0.03% Hindi and 0.02% Urdu as their first language.

=== Religion ===
Religion in Mathurapur II CD block (2011)
Hinduism	82.08%
Islam	15.37%
Christianity	2.40%
Other or not stated	0.15%

In the 2011 Census of India, Hindus numbered 181,262 and formed 82.08% of the population in Mathurapur II CD block. Muslims numbered 33,935 and formed 15.37% of the population. Others numbered 5,642 and formed 2.55% of the population. Amongst the others, Christians numbered 5,308. In 2001, Hindus were 83.39% of the population, while Muslims and Christians were 13.91% and 2.64% of the population respectively.

The proportion of Hindus in South Twenty-four Parganas district has declined from 76.0% in 1961 to 63.2% in 2011. The proportion of Muslims in South Twenty-four Parganas district has increased from 23.4% to 35.6% during the same period. Christians formed 0.8% in 2011.

== Rural poverty ==
As per the Human Development Report for South 24 Parganas district, published in 2009, in Mathurapur II CD block the percentage of households below poverty line was 39.59%. The poverty rates were very high in the Sundarbans settlements with all thirteen CD blocks registering poverty ratios above 30% and eight CD blocks had more than 40% of the population in the BPL category. The Sundarban region remains the most backward region in terms of quality of life. As per rural household survey in 2005, the proportion of households in South 24 Parganas with poverty rates below poverty line was 34.11%, way above the state and national poverty ratios.

== Economy ==
=== Livelihood ===
Livelihood
in Mathurapur II CD block
1. Cultivators (22.0%)
2. Agricultural labourers (42.6%)
3. Household industries (6.18%)
4. Other Workers (29.2%)

In Mathurapur II CD block in 2011, amongst the class of total workers, cultivators numbered 17,769 and formed 21.97%, agricultural labourers numbered 34,503 and formed 42.65%, household industry workers numbered 5,001 and formed 6.18% and other workers numbered 23,622 and formed 29.20%. Total workers numbered 80,895 and formed 33.63% of the total population, and non-workers numbered 139,944 and formed 63.37% of the population.

The District Human Development Report points out that in the blocks of region situated in the close proximity of the Kolkata metropolis, overwhelming majority are involved in the non-agricultural sector for their livelihood. On the other hand, in the Sundarban region, overwhelming majority are dependent on agriculture. In the intermediate region, there is again predominance of the non-agricultural sector. Though the region is not very close to Kolkata, many places are well connected and some industrial/ economic development has taken place.

Note: In the census records a person is considered a cultivator, if the person is engaged in cultivation/ supervision of land owned by self/government/institution. When a person who works on another person's land for wages in cash or kind or share, is regarded as an agricultural labourer. Household industry is defined as an industry conducted by one or more members of the family within the household or village, and one that does not qualify for registration as a factory under the Factories Act. Other workers are persons engaged in some economic activity other than cultivators, agricultural labourers and household workers. It includes factory, mining, plantation, transport and office workers, those engaged in business and commerce, teachers, entertainment artistes and so on.

=== Infrastructure ===
There are 27 inhabited villages in Mathurapur II CD block, as per the District Census Handbook, South Twenty-four Parganas, 2011. 100% villages have power supply. 27 villages (100%) have drinking water supply. 20 villages (74.07%) have post offices. 21 villages (77.78%) have telephones (including landlines, public call offices and mobile phones). 19 villages (70.37%) have pucca (paved) approach roads and 16 villages (59.26%) have transport communication (includes bus service, rail facility and navigable waterways). 9 villages (33.33%) have agricultural credit societies and 5 villages (18.52%) have banks.

=== Agriculture ===
South 24 Parganas had played a significant role in the Tebhaga movement launched by the Communist Party of India in 1946. Subsequently, Operation Barga was aimed at securing tenancy rights for the peasants. In Mathurapur II CD block 5,107.88 acres of land was acquired and vested. Out of this 4,526.23 acres or 88.68% of the vested land was distributed. The total number of patta (document) holders was 8,310.

According to the District Human Development Report, agriculture is an important source of livelihood in South Twentyfour Parganas district. The amount of cultivable land per agricultural worker is only 0.41 hectare in the district. Moreover, the irrigation facilities have not been extended to a satisfactory scale. Agriculture mostly remains a mono-cropped activity.

As per the District Census Handbook, the saline soil of the district is unfit for cultivation, but the non-salty lands are very fertile. While rice is the main food crop, jute is the main cash crop.

In 2013-14, there were 105 fertiliser depots, 11 seed stores and 44 fair price shops in Mathurapur II CD block.

In 2013–14, Mathurapur II CD block produced 34,980 tonnes of Aman paddy, the main winter crop, from 15,500 hectares, 292 tonnes of Aus paddy (summer crop) from 113 hectares, 15,020 tonnes of Boro paddy (spring crop) from 5,461 hectares, 1,882 tonnes of wheat from 637 hectares and 34 tonnes of potatoes from 1 hectare. It also produced pulses and oilseeds.

=== Pisciculture ===
In Mathurapur II CD block, in 2013-14, net area under effective pisciculture was 2,910 hectares, engaging 17,649 persons in the profession, and with an approximate annual production of 97,430 quintals.

Pisciculture is an important source of employment in South 24 Parganas district. As of 2001, more than 4.5 lakh people were engaged in Pisciculture. Out of this 2.57 lakhs were from the 13 blocks in the Sundarbans settlements.

=== Banking ===
In 2013-14, Mathurapur II CD block had offices of 7 commercial banks.

=== Backward Regions Grant Fund ===
South 24 Parganas district is listed as a backward region and receives financial support from the Backward Regions Grant Fund. The fund, created by the Government of India, is designed to redress regional imbalances in development. As of 2012, 272 districts across the country were listed under this scheme. The list includes 11 districts of West Bengal.

== Transport ==
Mathurapur II CD block has 6 ferry services and 3 originating/ terminating bus routes. The nearest railway station is 16 km from the block headquarters.

== Education ==
In 2013-14, Mathurapur II had 135 primary schools with 11,074 students, 15 middle schools with 1,336 students, 9 high schools with 3,637 students and 20 higher secondary schools with 12,437 students. Mathurapur II CD block had 1 general degree college with 3,207 students, 1 technical/ professional institution with 100 students, 445 institutions for special and non-formal education with 15,066 students.

See also – Education in India

As per the 2011 census, in Mathurapur II CD block, amongst the 27 inhabited villages, all villages had schools, 23 villages had two or more primary schools, 24 villages had at least 1 primary and 1 middle school and 18 villages had at least 1 middle and 1 secondary school.

- Raidighi College was established at Raidighi in 1995.

== Healthcare ==
In 2014, Mathurapur II CD block had 1 rural hospital, 3 primary health centres and 6 NGO/ private nursing homes with total 110 beds and 17 doctors (excluding private bodies). It had 45 family welfare subcentres. 7,125 patients were treated indoor and 109,803 patients were treated outdoor in the hospitals, health centres and subcentres of the CD block.

As per 2011 census, in Mathurapur II CD block, 3 villages had primary health centres, 17 villages had primary health subcentres, 1 village had a maternity and child welfare centre, 14 villages had medicine shops and out of the 27 inhabited villages 1 village had no medical facility.

Raidighi Rural Hospital at Raidighi, with 60 beds, is the major government medical facility in Mathurapur II CD block. There are primary health centres at Purandarpur (PO Pukurhat) (with 6 beds), Baribhanga Abad (with 6 beds) and Gilerchat (with 6 beds).
