= Sarmistha Purkait =

Indian politician

Member of the West Bengal Legislative Assembly
- Incumbent
- Assumed office 4 May 2026
- Preceded by: Namita Saha
- Constituency: Magrahat Purba

Personal details
- Party: Trinamool Congress
- Spouse: Sushanta Kumar Purkait
- Education: M.A in Bengali (2015)
- Alma mater: University of Calcutta

Sarmistha Purkait is an Indian politician from West Bengal, India. She is a member of All India Trinamool Congress. In 2026, she was elected to the West Bengal Legislative Assembly from Magrahat Purba as a member of the Trinamool Congress.
