= Nilima Mistry =

Indian politician (born 1983)

Nilima Mistry Bishal (born 1983) is an Indian politician from West Bengal. She is a member of the West Bengal Legislative Assembly from Basanti Assembly constituency, which is reserved for Scheduled Caste community in South 24 Parganas district, representing the Democratic Trinamool Congress.

Mistry is from Gosaba, South 24 Parganas district, West Bengal. She married Satyabrata Bishal, a businessman. She did her Master of Arts in history in 2006 at Rabindra Bharati University. She declared assets worth Rs.88 lakhs in her affidavit to the Election Commission of India.

== Career ==
Mistry won the Basanti Assembly constituency representing the All India Trinamool Congress in the 2026 West Bengal Legislative Assembly election. She polled 1,27,495 votes and defeated her nearest rival, Bikash Sardar of the Bharatiya Janata Party, by a margin of votes.
