= Raidighi Assembly constituency =

Constituency of the West Bengal Legislative Assembly, in India

Raidighi
- Constituency No. 134 for the West Bengal Legislative Assembly
- Interactive Map Outlining Raidighi Assembly Constituency

Constituency details
- Country: India
- Region: East India
- State: West Bengal
- District: South 24 Parganas
- Lok Sabha constituency: Mathurapur
- Established: 2011
- Total electors: 273,472
- Reservation: None

Member of Legislative Assembly
- 18th West Bengal Legislative Assembly
- Incumbent Tapas Mondal
- Party: AITC
- Alliance: AITC+
- Elected year: 2026

Raidighi Assembly constituency is a Legislative Assembly constituency of South 24 Parganas district in the Indian State of West Bengal.

== Overview ==
As per order of the Delimitation Commission in respect of the Delimitation of constituencies in the West Bengal, Raidighi Assembly constituency is composed of the following:

- Abad Bhagawanpur, Debipur, Krishnachandrapur, Lalpur, Nalua and Shankarpur gram panchayats of Mathurapur I community development block
- Mathurapur II community development block

Raidighi Assembly constituency is a part of No. 20 Mathurapur Lok Sabha constituency.

== Members of the Legislative Assembly ==
Year	Name	Party
2011	Debashree Roy	Trinamool Congress
2016	Debashree Roy	Trinamool Congress
2021	Aloke Jaldata	Trinamool Congress
2026	Tapas Mondal	Trinamool Congress

== Election results ==
=== 2026 ===
2026 West Bengal Legislative Assembly election: Raidighi
Party	Candidate	Votes	%	±%
AITC	Tapas Mondal	118,991	46.16	▼2.31
BJP	Palash Rana	113,034	43.85	▲10.28
CPI(M)	Samya Ganguly	19,160	7.43	▼8.04
NOTA	None of the above	1,152	0.45	▼0.16
Majority		5,957	2.31	▼12.59
Turnout		257,773	96.21	▲8.95
AITC hold		Swing		

=== 2021 ===
2021 West Bengal Legislative Assembly election: Raidighi
Party	Candidate	Votes	%	±%
AITC	Aloke Jaldata	115,707	48.47	▲1.99
BJP	Shantanu Bapuli	80,139	33.57	▲30.03
CPI(M)	Kanti Ganguly	36,931	15.47	▼30.45
SUCI(C)	Gunasindhu Haldar	2,862	1.2	▼0.88
NOTA	None of the above	1,462	0.61	
Majority		35,568	14.9	
Turnout		238,720	87.26	
AITC hold		Swing		

=== 2016 ===
2016 West Bengal Legislative Assembly election: Raidighi
Party	Candidate	Votes	%	±%
AITC	Debashree Roy	101,161	46.48	▼3.28
CPI(M)	Kanti Ganguly	99,932	45.92	▼0.88
BJP	Sanghamitra Chaudhuri	7,703	3.54	▲1.74
SUCI(C)	Gunasindhu Haldar	4,527	2.08	New entry
NOTA	None of the above	1,710	0.79	New entry
BSP	Rajendra Naskar	916	0.42	▼0.24
Majority		1,229	0.56	▼2.40
Turnout		2,17,640	89.30	▼1.16
AITC hold		Swing		

=== 2011 ===
2011 West Bengal Legislative Assembly election: Raidighi
Party	Candidate	Votes	%	±%
AITC	Debashree Roy	93,236	49.76	
CPI(M)	Kanti Ganguly	87,683	46.80	
BJP	Dwijendranath Halder	3,369	1.80	
Independent	Debasree Kayal	1,295	0.69	
BSP	Dulal Chand Ghorami	1,245	0.66	
Independent	Ajay Das	542	0.29	
Majority		5,553	2.96	
Turnout		1,87,370	90.46	
AITC win (new seat)				
