= Raydighi Abad =

- Village
- Location in West Bengal Location in India
- Coordinates: 22.0012°N 88.4354°E
- Country: India
- State: West Bengal
- District: South 24 Parganas
- CD Block: Mathurapur II

Area
  - Total: 11.28 km^{2} (4.36 sq mi)
- Elevation: 7 m (23 ft)

Population (2011)
  - Total: 20,467
  - Density: 1,814/km^{2} (4,699/sq mi)

Languages
  - Official: Bengali
  - Additional official: English
- Time zone: UTC+5:30 (IST)
- PIN: 743383
- Telephone code: +91 3174
- Vehicle registration: WB-19 to WB-22, WB-95 to WB-99
- Lok Sabha constituency: Mathurapur (SC)
- Vidhan Sabha constituency: Raidighi
- Website: www.s24pgs.gov.in

Raydighi Abad is a village and a gram panchayat within the jurisdiction of the Raydighi police station in the Mathurapur II CD block in the Diamond Harbour subdivision of the South 24 Parganas district in the Indian state of West Bengal.

== Geography ==
Cities and towns in the eastern part of Diamond Harbour subdivision (including Magrahat I & II, Mandirbazar, Mathurapur I & II CD blocks) in South 24 Parganas district
M: municipal city/ town, CT: census town, R: rural/ urban centre, N: neighbourhood, T: religious centre
Owing to space constraints in the small map, the actual locations in a larger map may vary slightly

=== Area overview ===
Diamond Harbour subdivision is a rural subdivision with patches of urbanisation. Only 14.61% of the population lives in the urban areas and an overwhelming 85.39% lives in the rural areas. In the eastern portion of the subdivision (shown in the map alongside) there are 24 census towns. The entire district is situated in the Ganges Delta and the eastern part of the district is a flat plain area with small towns, many in clusters. Location of places in the larger map varies a little. It is an OpenStreetMap, while we are using coordinates as in Google Maps.

Note: The map alongside presents some of the notable locations in the subdivision. All places marked in the map are linked in the larger full screen map.

=== Location ===
Raydighi Abad is located at 22°00′04″N 88°26′07″E. It has an average elevation of 7 metres (23 ft).

== Demographics ==
According to the 2011 Indian Census, Raydighi Abad had a total population of 20,467, of which 10,584 were males and 9,883 were females. There were 2,501 persons in the age range of 0–6 years. The total number of literate persons in Raydighi Abad was 14,370, which constituted 70.2% of the population with male literacy of 75.4% and female literacy of 64.6%. The effective literacy rate of 7+ population of Raydighi Abad was 80.0%, of which male literacy rate was 86.4% and female literacy rate was 73.2%. The Scheduled Castes and Scheduled Tribes population was 3,831 and 475 respectively. Raydighi Abad had 4243 households in 2011.

== Civic administration ==
=== Police station ===
Raydighi police station covers an area of 230.5 km^{2}. It has jurisdiction over parts of the Mathurapur II CD block.

== Social scenario ==
According to the District Human Development Report for the South 24 Parganas, “The district is typically at the lower rung of the ladder in terms of district per capita income compared to other districts of West Bengal… This place also houses the largest proportion of backward people compared to the state… So far as the crime scenario is concerned the economically weaker group, i.e. the women and children, suffer the most in this district.”

== Transport ==
Bishnupur-Raydighi Road links Raydighi Abad to the State Highway 1.

Mathurapur Road railway station is located nearby.

== Education ==
Raidighi College, established in 1995, is affiliated with the University of Calcutta. It offers honours courses in Bengali, English, education, history, political science, geography, mathematics, zoology, microbiology, food & nutrition and physics, and general courses in arts and science.

== Culture ==
Jatar Deul, an 11th-century Shiva temple, is located at Kankandighi/ Jata, near Raydighi Abad.

== Healthcare ==
Raydighi Rural Hospital, with 60 beds, is the major government medical facility in the Mathurapur II CD block.

== Notable people ==
- Kanti Ganguly, Social Worker and former MLA.
