= Subhas Naskar =

Indian politician

Minister for Irrigation & Waterways
- In office 2005–2011
- Governor: Viren J. Shah; Gopalkrishna Gandhi; M.K. Narayanan
- Preceded by: Amarendralal Roy
- Succeeded by: Manas Bhunia

Deputy Leader of the Opposition in West Bengal
- In office 13 May 2011 – 19 May 2016
- Leader: Surjya Kanta Mishra
- Preceded by: Abu Hasem Khan Choudhury
- Succeeded by: Nepal Mahata

MLA
- In office 1982–2016
- Preceded by: Kalipada Burman
- Succeeded by: Gobinda Chandra Naskar
- Constituency: Basanti

Personal details
- Born: 13 January 1952 (age 74) Basanti, South 24 Parganas, West Bengal
- Party: RSP
- Education: University of Calcutta (B.A.)
- Profession: Politician, Teacher, social worker

Subhas Naskar is an Indian politician, belonging to the Revolutionary Socialist Party. He served as Irrigation Minister in the Left Front government of West Bengal. He has won the Basanti Legislative Assembly seat in the 1982, 1987, 1991, 1996, 2001, 2006 and 2011 elections. After the 2011 assembly election he was elected as Deputy Leader of the Opposition in the West Bengal Legislative Assembly.

Subhas Naskar's ancestral house at Basanti was attacked during panchayat elections in 2008 and a bomb was allegedly thrown by CPI(M) supporters, fatally injuring his nephew's wife.

The son of the late Prajapati Naskar, he is a graduate and a former school teacher.
