= Chitta Roy =

Indian politician

Chitta Ranjan Roy was an Indian politician from West Bengal, belonging to the Socialist Unity Centre of India (SUCI). He was a Member of Parliament 1967–1970.

Roy was elected to the Lok Sabha (the lower house of the Parliament of India) in the 1967 election. Roy contested the Joynagar constituency, obtaining 157,545 votes (43.95%). At the time of the 1967 elections, SUCI was part of the United Left Front led by the Communist Party of India (Marxist) (CPI(M)). In the Lok Sabha, Roy sat in the United Interparliamentary Group. During his parliamentary tenure he raised five starred and six unstarred questions in the Question Hour. He served as president of the South Eastern Zone of the All India Station Masters' Association

Roy stood for re-election in the 1971 Lok Sabha election. He finished in third place with 76,423 votes (20.01%), trailing behind the Congress and CPI(M) candidates.

Roy died in 1994.
