= Jaynagar Lok Sabha constituency =

Lok Sabha Constituency in West Bengal, India

Coordinates: 22°10′31″N 88°25′12″E

Jaynagar WB-19
- Lok Sabha constituency
- Interactive Map Outlining Jaynagar Lok Sabha Constituency

Constituency details
- Country: India
- Region: East India
- State: West Bengal
- Assembly constituencies: Gosaba; Basanti; Kultali; Jaynagar; Canning Paschim; Canning Purba; Magrahat Purba
- Established: 1962–present
- Total electors: 1,645,203
- Reservation: SC

Member of Parliament
- 18th Lok Sabha
- Incumbent Pratima Mondal
- Party: AITC
- Alliance: INDIA
- Elected year: 2024

Jaynagar Lok Sabha constituency or Joynagar Lok Sabha constituency is one of the 543 Parliamentary constituencies in India. The constituency centres on Jaynagar Majilpur in West Bengal. All the seven legislative assembly segments of No. 19 Jaynagar Lok Sabha constituency are in South 24 Parganas district. The seat is reserved for Scheduled Castes.

== Assembly segments ==
Parliamentary constituencies in West Bengal - 1. Cooch Behar, 2. Alipurduars, 3. Jalpaiguri, 4. Darjeeling, 5. Raiganj, 6. Balurghat, 7. Maldaha Uttar, 8. Maldaha Dakshin, 9. Jangipur, 10. Baharampur, 11. Murshidabad, 12. Krishnanagar, 13. Ranaghat, 14. Bangaon, 15. Barrackpore, 16. Dum Dum, 17. Barasat, 18. Basirhat, 19. Jaynagar, 20. Mathurapur, 21. Diamond Harbour, 22. Jadavpur, 23. Kolkata Dakshin, 24. Kolkata Uttar, 25. Howrah, 26. Uluberia, 27. Serampore, 28. Hooghly, 29. Arambagh, 30. Tamluk, 31, Kanthi, 32. Ghatal, 33. Jhargram, 34. Medinipur, 35. Purulia, 36. Bankura, 37. Bishnupur, 38. Bardhaman Purba, 39. Bardhaman Durgapur, 40. Asansol, 41. Bolpur, 42. Birbhum

As per order of the Delimitation Commission regarding the delimitation of constituencies in West Bengal, the Jaynagar Lok Sabha constituency is composed of the following legislative assembly segments from 2009:

#	Name	District	Member	Party	2024 Lead
127	Gosaba (SC)	South 24 Parganas	Bikarna Naskar	BJP	AITC
128	Basanti (SC)	South 24 Parganas	Nilima Mistry	AITC	AITC
129	Kultali (SC)	South 24 Parganas	Ganesh Chandra Mondal	AITC	AITC
136	Jaynagar (SC)	South 24 Parganas	Biswanath Das	AITC	AITC
138	Canning Paschim (SC)	South 24 Parganas	Paresh Ram Das	AITC	AITC
139	Canning Purba	South 24 Parganas	Mohammad Baharul Islam	AITC	AITC
141	Magrahat Purba (SC)	South 24 Parganas	Sharmistha Purkait	AITC	AITC

== Members of Parliament ==
Year	Member	Party
1962	Paresh Nath Kayal	Indian National Congress
1967	Chitta Ranjan Roy (Note: Contested and won as Independent Candidate)	Socialist Unity Centre of India (Communist)
1971	Sakti Kumar Sarkar	Indian National Congress
1977	Sakti Kumar Sarkar	Janata Party
1980	Sanat Kumar Mandal	Revolutionary Socialist Party
1984	Sanat Kumar Mandal	Revolutionary Socialist Party
1989	Sanat Kumar Mandal	Revolutionary Socialist Party
1991	Sanat Kumar Mandal	Revolutionary Socialist Party
1996	Sanat Kumar Mandal	Revolutionary Socialist Party
1998	Sanat Kumar Mandal	Revolutionary Socialist Party
1999	Sanat Kumar Mandal	Revolutionary Socialist Party
2004	Sanat Kumar Mandal	Revolutionary Socialist Party
2009	Tarun Mandal	Socialist Unity Centre of India
2014	Pratima Mondal	Trinamool Congress
2019	Pratima Mondal	Trinamool Congress
2024	Pratima Mondal	Trinamool Congress

== Election results ==
Vote share of Winning candidates
2024	60.32%
2019	56.13%
2014	41.71%
2009	48.72%
2004	55.81%
1999	49.39%
1998	48.48%
1996	48.17%
1991	46.01%
1989	45.35%
1984	44.17%
1980	45.72%
1977	48.92%
1971	41.61%
1967	43.95%
1962	53.28%

=== 2024 ===
2024 Indian general election: Jaynagar
Party	Candidate	Votes	%	±%
AITC	Pratima Mondal	894,312	60.32	▲4.19
BJP	Ashok Kandari	424,093	28.60	▼4.17
AISF	Meghnath Halder	65,372	4.41	New
RSP	Samarendra Nath Mandal	40,113	2.71	▼2.30
SUCI(C)	Niranjan Naskar	14,622	0.99	▼1.83
NOTA	None of the above	9,788	0.66	
Majority		470,219		
Turnout		1,482,631		
AITC hold		Swing		

=== 2019 ===
2019 Indian general election: Jaynagar
Party	Candidate	Votes	%	±%
AITC	Pratima Mondal	761,206	56.13	+14.42
BJP	Ashok Kandari	444,427	32.77	+23.23
RSP	Subhas Naskar	67,913	5.01	−27.57
SUCI(C)	Joy Krishna Halder	38,261	2.82	−7.08
INC	Tapan Mondal	18,758	1.38	−2.87
Majority		316,775	23.36	14.22
Turnout		1,356,386	82.29	
AITC hold		Swing		

=== 2014 ===
2014 Indian general election: Jaynagar
Party	Candidate	Votes	%	±%
AITC	Pratima Mondal	4,94,746	41.71	−
RSP	Subhas Naskar	3,86,362	32.58	−10.28
SUCI(C)	Tarun Mandal	1,17,454	9.90	−38.82
BJP	Krishnapada Majumdar	1,13,206	9.54	+6.85
INC	Arnab Roy	38,493	3.25	+3.25
AIUDF	Taranga Mondal	13,333	1.12	
NOTA	None of The Above	8,819	0.60	−−−
Majority		1,08,384	9.14	
Turnout		11,89,048	81.51	
AITC gain from SUCI(C)		Swing		

=== 2009 ===
2009 Indian general election:Jaynagar
Party	Candidate	Votes	%	±%
SUCI(C)	Tarun Mandal (Note: Tarun Mandal contested as Independent Candidate with backing of UPA alliance (AITC + INC))	4,46,200	48.72	
RSP	Nimai Barman	3,92,495	42.86	
BJP	Nirode Chandra Halder	24,608	2.15	
AIUDF	Taranga Mondal	17,087	1.49	
IND	Shyamal Naskar	10,809	0.95	
Majority		53,705	5.90	
Turnout		9,15,836	80.08	
SUCI(C) gain from RSP		Swing		

=== 2004 ===
2004 Indian general election: Joynagar (SC)
Party	Candidate	Votes	%	±%
RSP	Sanat Kumar Mandal	450,043	55.81	
BJP	Asit Baran Thakur	219,522	27.22	
Independent	Tarun Kanti Naskar	90,798	11.26	
RPI	Sukriti Ranjan Biswas	21,711	2.69	
Independent	Sanat Kumar Dhali	14,340	1.78	
BSP	Meghnath Halder	9,920	1.23	
Majority		230,521	28.59	
Turnout				
RSP hold		Swing		

=== 1999 ===
1999 Indian general election: Joynagar (SC)
Party	Candidate	Votes	%	±%
RSP	Sanat Kumar Mandal	396,383	49.39	
BJP	Krishna Pada Majumder	284,082	35.40	
Independent	Renu Pada Halder	74,016	9.22	
INC	Jagat Pada Sanpui	46,173	5.75	
Independent	Vivek Sonkar	1,446	0.18	
Independent	Subhas Mondal	429	0.05	
Majority		112,301	13.99	
Turnout		815,915	73.05	
RSP hold		Swing		

=== 1998 ===
1998 Indian general election: Joynagar (SC)
Party	Candidate	Votes	%	±%
RSP	Sanat Kumar Mandal	406,745	48.48	
BJP	Krishnapada Majumdar	230,684	27.49	
INC	Jagat Pada Sanpui	107,119	12.77	
Independent	Tarun Kanti Naskar	94,468	11.26	
Majority		176,061	20.99	
Turnout		858,356	77.98	
RSP hold		Swing		

=== 1996 ===
1996 Indian general election: Joynagar (SC)
Party	Candidate	Votes	%	±%
RSP	Sanat Kumar Mandal	418,373	48.17	
INC	Jogesh Roy	274,446	31.60	
Independent	Tarun Kanti Naskar	130,571	15.03	
BJP	Chandra Kanta Sarkar	42,300	4.87	
Independent	Sakti Kumar Sarkar	2,831	0.33	
Majority		143,927	16.57	
Turnout		894,592	84.11	
RSP hold		Swing		

=== 1991 ===
1991 Indian general election: Joynagar (SC)
Party	Candidate	Votes	%	±%
RSP	Sanat Kumar Mandal	338,408	46.01	
INC	Naraiyan Naskar	206,103	28.02	
Independent	Tarun Naskar	108,152	14.70	
BJP	Pradyot Naskar	81,293	11.05	
Independent	Khitish Chandra Haldher	1,583	0.22	
Majority		132,305	17.99	
Turnout		754,350	78.88	
RSP hold		Swing		

=== 1989 ===
1989 Indian general election: Joynagar (SC)
Party	Candidate	Votes	%	±%
RSP	Sanat Kumar Mandal	337,611	45.35	
INC	Ardhendu Sekhar Naskar	273,804	36.78	
Independent	Raja Ram Ray Mandal	114,430	15.37	
BJP	Anadi Naskar	14,055	1.89	
Independent	Radha Gobinda Mondal	1,925	0.26	
BSP	Sabita Naskar	1,503	0.20	
AMB	Jagdish Kirtania	1,057	0.14	
Majority		63,807	8.57	
Turnout		758,242	81.34	
RSP hold		Swing		

=== 1984 ===
1984 Indian general election: Joynagar (SC)
Party	Candidate	Votes	%	±%
RSP	Sanat Kumar Mandal	264,406	44.17	
INC	Ardhendu Sekhar Naskar	243,957	40.76	
SUCI(C)	Rajaram Raymondal	88,147	14.73	
Independent	Jagadish Chandra Kirtania	2,045	0.34	
Majority		20,449	3.41	
Turnout		611,190	80.11	
RSP hold		Swing		

=== 1980 ===
1980 Indian general election: Joynagar (SC)
Party	Candidate	Votes	%	±%
RSP	Sanat Kumar Mandal	236,044	45.72	
INC(I)	Gobinda Chandra Naskar	187,515	36.32	
SUCI(C)	Rajaram Raymandal	82,645	16.01	
JP	Sakti Kumar Sarkar	10,058	1.95	
Majority		48,529	9.40	
Turnout		528,333	75.97	
Swing to RSP from JP		Swing		

=== 1977 ===
1977 Indian general election: Joynagar (SC)
Party	Candidate	Votes	%	±%
JP	Sakti Kumar Sarkar	180,587	48.92	
INC	Nirmal Kanti Mondal	119,950	32.49	
SUCI(C)	Probodh Purkait	68,646	18.59	
Majority		60,637	16.43	
Turnout		380,213	60.73	
Swing to JP from INC		Swing		

=== 1971 ===
1971 Indian general election: Joynagar (SC)
Party	Candidate	Votes	%	±%
INC	Sakti Kumar Sarkar	158,943	41.61	
CPI(M)	Nirmal Kumar Sinha	84,707	22.18	
SUCI(C)	Chittaranjan Roy	76,423	20.01	
RSP	Santosh Kayal	41,001	10.73	
Independent	Ranabir Barman	14,305	3.74	
Bangla Congress	Haripada Mandal	6,604	1.73	
Majority		74,236	19.43	
Turnout		393,696	70.16	
Swing to INC from Independent		Swing		

=== 1967 ===
1967 Indian general election: Joynagar (SC)
Party	Candidate	Votes	%	±%
Independent	Chitta Roy	157,545	43.95	
INC	P. Koyal	128,474	35.84	
Independent	K. P. Naskar	72,420	20.20	
Majority		29,071	8.11	
Turnout		373,749	71.07	
Swing to Independent from INC		Swing		

=== 1962 ===
1962 Indian general election: Joynagar (SC)
Party	Candidate	Votes	%	±%
INC	Paresh Nath Kayal	152,372	53.28	
CPI	Sailendra Nath Haldar	133,601	46.72	
Majority		18,771	6.56	
Turnout		297,962	55.98	
INC win (new seat)				

== See also ==
- Jaynagar Majilpur
- List of constituencies of the Lok Sabha
