= Magrahat Purba Assembly constituency =

Constituency of the West Bengal Legislative Assembly, in India

Magrahat Purba
- Constituency No. 141 for the West Bengal Legislative Assembly
- Interactive Map Outlining Magrahat Purba Assembly Constituency

Constituency details
- Country: India
- Region: East India
- State: West Bengal
- District: South 24 Parganas
- Lok Sabha constituency: Jaynagar
- Established: 1951
- Total electors: 242,395
- Reservation: SC

Member of Legislative Assembly
- 18th West Bengal Legislative Assembly
- Incumbent Sharmistha Purkait
- Party: AITC
- Alliance: AITC+
- Elected year: 2026

Magrahat Purba Assembly constituency is a Legislative Assembly constituency of South 24 Parganas district in the Indian State of West Bengal. It is reserved for Scheduled Castes.

== Overview ==
As per order of the Delimitation Commission in respect of the Delimitation of constituencies in the West Bengal, Magrahat Purba Assembly constituency is composed of the following:

- Magrahat II community development block

Magrahat Purba Assembly constituency is a part of No. 19 Jaynagar Lok Sabha constituency.

== Members of the Legislative Assembly ==
Year	Name	Party
Magrahat
1952	Abdul Hashem	Indian National Congress
1952	Ardhendu Sekhar Naskar	Indian National Congress
1957	Abdul Hashem	Indian National Congress
1957	Ardhendu Sekhar Naskar	Indian National Congress
Magrahat Purba
1962	Ardhendu Sekhar Naskar	Indian National Congress
1967	Radhika Ranjan Pramanik	Communist Party of India (Marxist)
1969	Radhika Ranjan Pramanik	Communist Party of India (Marxist)
1971	Radhika Ranjan Pramanik	Communist Party of India (Marxist)
1972	Manoranjan Halder	Indian National Congress
1977	Radhika Ranjan Pramanik	Communist Party of India (Marxist)
1982	Radhika Ranjan Pramanik	Communist Party of India (Marxist)
1987	Radhika Ranjan Pramanik	Communist Party of India (Marxist)
1991	Nirmal Sinha	Communist Party of India (Marxist)
1996	Nirmal Sinha	Communist Party of India (Marxist)
2001	Bansari Mohan Kanji	Communist Party of India (Marxist)
2006	Bansari Mohan Kanji	Communist Party of India (Marxist)
2011	Namita Saha	Trinamool Congress
2016	Namita Saha	Trinamool Congress
2021	Namita Saha	Trinamool Congress
2026	Sharmistha Purkait	Trinamool Congress

== Election results ==
=== 2026 ===
2026 West Bengal Legislative Assembly election: Magrahat Purba
Party	Candidate	Votes	%	±%
AITC	Sharmistha Purkait	108,412	48.8	▼5.02
BJP	Uttam Kumar Banik	76,805	34.57	▲6.99
CPI(M)	Chandan Saha	29,188	13.14	▼3.27
INC	Atanu Halder	4,733	2.13	
NOTA	None of the above	858	0.39	▼0.33
Majority		31,607	14.23	▼12.01
Turnout		222,178	95.47	▲10.47
AITC hold		Swing		

=== 2021 ===
2021 West Bengal Legislative Assembly election: Magrahat Purba
Party	Candidate	Votes	%	±%
AITC	Namita Saha	110,945	53.82	▲5.12
BJP	Chandan Kumar Naskar	56,866	27.58	▲22.43
CPI(M)	Chandan Saha	33,822	16.41	▼27.09
NOTA	None of the above	1,480	0.72	
Majority		54,079	26.24	
Turnout		206,153	85.0	
AITC hold		Swing		

=== 2016 ===
2016 West Bengal Legislative Assembly election: Magrahat Purba
Party	Candidate	Votes	%	±%
AITC	Namita Saha	89,486	48.70	▼0.98
CPI(M)	Chandan Saha	79,926	43.50	▼0.37
BJP	Chandan Kumar Naskar	9,460	5.15	▲2.19
NOTA	None of the Above	1,491	0.81	New entry
BSP	Rabiram Naskar	1,371	0.75	New entry
SUCI	Sanjay Mandal	1,133	0.62	New entry
Independent	Pitam Mandal	877	0.48	New entry
Majority		9,560	5.2	▼0.91
Turnout		1,83,744	86.66	▲1.39
AITC hold		Swing		

=== 2011 ===
2011 West Bengal Legislative Assembly election: Magrahat Purba
Party	Candidate	Votes	%	±%
AITC	Namita Saha	75,217	49.68	
CPI(M)	Chandan Saha	66,414	41.08	
BJP	Ratan Kumar Sardar	4,476	2.96	
Independent	Swapan Mondal	1,419	0.94	
Independent	Namita Mistri	640	0.42	
Majority		8,803	6.11	
Turnout		1,51,397	85.27	
AITC gain from CPI(M)		Swing		

=== 2006 ===
In 2006 and 2001, Bansari Mohan Kanji of CPI(M) won the Magrahat Purba Assembly constituency defeating his nearest rival Namita Saha of AITC. Nirmal Sinha of CPI(M) defeated Namita Saha of INC in 1996 and 1991. Radhika Ranjan Pramanik of CPI(M) defeated Manoranjan Halder of INC in 1987, Nirmal Kanti Mondal of INC in 1982 and Manoranjan Halder of INC in 1977.

=== 1972 ===
Manoranjan Halder of INC won in 1972. Radhika Ranjan Pramanik of CPI(M) won in 1971, 1969 and 1967. Ardhendu Sekhar Naskar of INC won in 1962. In 1957 and 1952, Magrahat Assembly constituency had joint seats. In 1957, Abdul Hashem and Ardhendu Sekhar Naskar, both of INC, won. In 1952, Abdul Hashem and Ardhendu Sekhar Naskar, both of INC, won.
