= Barijpur =

- Census Town
- Location in West Bengal Location in India
- Coordinates: 22.2275°N 88.2894°E
- Country: India
- State: West Bengal
- District: South 24 Parganas
- CD block: Magrahat I

Area
  - Total: 1.45 km^{2} (0.56 sq mi)
- Elevation: 8 m (26 ft)

Population (2011)
  - Total: 5,536
  - Density: 3,820/km^{2} (9,890/sq mi)

Languages
  - Official: Bengali
  - Additional official: English
- Time zone: UTC+5:30 (IST)
- PIN: 743375
- Telephone code: +91 3174
- Vehicle registration: WB-19 to WB-22, WB-95 to WB-99
- Lok Sabha constituency: Mathurapur (SC)
- Vidhan Sabha constituency: Magrahat Paschim
- Website: www.s24pgs.gov.in

Barijpur is a census town within the jurisdiction of the Usthi police station in the Magrahat I CD block in the Diamond Harbour subdivision of the South 24 Parganas district in the Indian state of West Bengal.

== Geography ==
Cities and towns in the eastern part of Diamond Harbour subdivision (including Magrahat I & II, Mandirbazar, Mathurapur I & II CD blocks) in South 24 Parganas district
M: municipal city/ town, CT: census town, R: rural/ urban centre, N: neighbourhood, T: religious centre
Owing to space constraints in the small map, the actual locations in a larger map may vary slightly

=== Area overview ===
Diamond Harbour subdivision is a rural subdivision with patches of urbanization. Only 14.61% of the population lives in the urban areas and an overwhelming 85.39% lives in the rural areas. In the eastern portion of the subdivision (shown in the map alongside) there are 24 census towns. The entire district is situated in the Ganges Delta and the eastern part of the district is a flat plain area with small towns, many in clusters. Location of places in the larger map varies a little. It is an OpenStreetMap, while we are using coordinates as in Google Maps.

Note: The map alongside presents some of the notable locations in the subdivision. All places marked in the map are linked in the larger full screen map.

=== Location ===
Barijpur is located at 22.2275°N 88.2894°E

Usthi, Ghola Noapara, Barijpur and Uttar Kusum form a cluster of census towns in the Magrahat I CD block. Uttar Bishnupur, Kalikapota and Bamna are a little away from this cluster. This is as per the map of the Magrahat I CD block on page 445 in the District Census Handbook for South 24 Parganas.

== Demographics ==
According to the 2011 Census of India, Barijpur had a total population of 5,536 of which 2,941 (53%) were males and 2,595 (47%) were females. There were 868 persons in the age range of 0–6 years. The total number of literate persons in Barijpur was 3,328 (71.29% of the population over 6 years).

== Infrastructure ==
According to the District Census Handbook 2011, Barijpur covered an area of 1.4545 km^{2}. Among the civic amenities, it had 412 domestic electric connections. Among the medical facilities Barijpur had 5 medicine shops. Among the educational facilities it had were 2 primary schools, the nearest secondary and senior secondary schools at Uttar Kusum 2 km away.

== Transport ==
Barijpur is on the Uttar Kusum-Nazra Road.

Deula railway station is located nearby.

== Healthcare ==
Baneswarpur Rural Hospital, with 30 beds, at Baneswarpur is the major government medical facility in the Magrahat I CD block.
