= Falta =

Falta may refer to:

- Falta, South 24 Parganas, a town in the Indian state of West Bengal
- Falta (community development block), an administrative division in South 24 Parganas district, West Bengal
- Falta (Vidhan Sabha constituency), a legislative assembly constituency in South 24 Parganas district, West Bengal
- Falta Amor, an album by Mexican rock band Maná released in 1990
- Jaroslav Falta (born 1951), Czech motocross racer
- Ladislav Falta (born 1936), Czech sport shooter and Olympic medalist
- Šimon Falta, Czech footballer
- 4663 Falta, a minor planet in the asteroid belt
