= Ajodhyanagar =

- Census Town
- Location in West Bengal Location in India
- Coordinates: 22.3278°N 88.2714°E
- Country: India
- State: West Bengal
- District: South 24 Parganas
- CD block: Magrahat I

Area
  - Total: 1.03 km^{2} (0.40 sq mi)
- Elevation: 8 m (26 ft)

Population (2011)
  - Total: 4,409
  - Density: 4,280/km^{2} (11,100/sq mi)

Languages
  - Official: Bengali
  - Additional official: English
- Time zone: UTC+5:30 (IST)
- PIN: 743513
- Telephone code: +91 3174
- Vehicle registration: WB-19 to WB-22, WB-95 to WB-99
- Lok Sabha constituency: Mathurapur (SC)
- Vidhan Sabha constituency: Magrahat Paschim
- Website: www.s24pgs.gov.in

Ajodhyanagar is a census town within the jurisdiction of the Usthi police station in the Magrahat I CD block in the Diamond Harbour subdivision of the South 24 Parganas district in the Indian state of West Bengal.

== Geography ==
Cities and towns in the eastern part of Diamond Harbour subdivision (including Magrahat I & II, Mandirbazar, Mathurapur I & II CD blocks) in South 24 Parganas district
M: municipal city/ town, CT: census town, R: rural/ urban centre, N: neighbourhood, T: religious place
Owing to space constraints in the small map, the actual locations in a larger map may vary slightly

=== Area overview ===
Diamond Harbour subdivision is a rural subdivision with patches of urbanization. Only 14.61% of the population lives in the urban areas and an overwhelming 85.39% lives the rural areas. In the eastern portion of the subdivision (shown in the map alongside) there are 24 census towns. The entire district is situated in the Ganges Delta and the eastern part of the district is a flat plain area with small towns, many in clusters. Location of places in the larger map varies a little. It is an OpenStreetMap, while we are using coordinates as in Google Maps.

Note: The map alongside presents some of the notable locations in the subdivision. All places marked in the map are linked in the larger full screen map.

=== Location ===
Ajodhyanagar is located at 22.3278°N 88.2714°E

Hasimnagar, Baneshwarpur of the Falta CD block and Ajodhyanagar, Sirakol of the Magrahat I CD block form a cluster of census towns.

== Demographics ==
According to the 2011 Census of India, Ajodhyanagar had a total population of 4,409 of which 2,173 (49%) were males and 2,236 (51%) were females. There were 584 persons in the age range of 0–6 years. The total number of literate persons in Ajodhyanagar was 2,691 (70.35% of the population over 6 years).

== Infrastructure ==
According to the District Census Handbook 2011, Ajodhyanagar covered an area of 1.0252 km^{2}. Among the civic amenities, the protected water supply involved overhead tank. It had 353 domestic electric connections. Among the medical facilities it had 3 hospitals, 4 dispensaries/ health centres and 6 medicine shops. Among the educational facilities it had were 1 primary school, 1 middle school, 1 secondary school, 1 senior secondary school.

== Transport ==
Ajodhyanagar is on the National Highway 12.

== Healthcare ==
Baneswarpur Rural Hospital, with 30 beds, at Baneswarpur, is the major government medical facility in the Magrahat I CD block.
