= Sangrampur, Magrahat =

Sangrampur
- Village
- Location in West Bengal Location in India
- Coordinates: 22.2254°N 88.3290°E
- Country: India
- State: West Bengal
- District: South 24 Parganas
- CD block: Magrahat I
- Elevation: 8 m (26 ft)

Languages
  - Official: Bengali
  - Additional official: English
- Time zone: UTC+5:30 (IST)
- PIN: 743355
- Telephone code: +91 3174
- Vehicle registration: WB-19 to WB-22, WB-95 to WB-99
- Lok Sabha constituency: Mathurapur (SC)
- Vidhan Sabha constituency: Magrahat Paschim
- Website: www.s24pgs.gov.in

Sangrampur is a village within the jurisdiction of the Usthi police station in the Magrahat I CD block in the Diamond Harbour subdivision of the South 24 Parganas district in the Indian state of West Bengal.

== Geography ==
Sangrampur is located at 22°13′31″N 88°19′44″E. It has an average elevation of 8 metres (26 ft).

== Demographics ==
Sangrampur is not identified as a separate place in 2011 cenus. It seems to be a part of Samashat mouza as per map of Magrahat I CD block on page 445 in the District Census Handbook for South 24 Parganas.

As per the 2011 Census of India, Samshat had a total population of 4,829, of which 2,436 (50%) were males and 2,393 (50%) were females. Population below 6 years was 782. The total number of literates in Samashat was 3,059 (75.59% of the population over 6 years).

== Transport ==
Sangrampur is on the Usthi-Magrahat Road.

Sangrampur railway station is on the Sealdah–Diamond Harbour line of the Kolkata Suburban Railway system.

=== Commuters ===
With the electrification of the railways, suburban traffic has grown tremendously since the 1960s. As of 2005–06, more than 1.7 million (17 lakhs) commuters use the Kolkata Suburban Railway system daily. After the partition of India, refugees from East Pakistan/ Bangladesh had a strong impact on the development of urban areas in the periphery of Kolkata. The new immigrants depended on Kolkata for their livelihood, thus increasing the number of commuters. Eastern Railway runs 1,272 EMU trains daily.

== 2011 methanol tragedy ==
A methanol-tainted batch of illegal alcohol killed 143 people in India in December 2011, affecting mainly manual workers in Sangrampur.

== Healthcare ==
Baneswarpur Rural Hospital, with 30 beds, at Baneswarpur is the major government medical facility in Magrahat I CD block.
