= Ghanshyampur =

Ghanshyampur may refer to:

- Ghanshyampur Assembly constituency, in Darbhanga district, Bihar, India
- Ghanshyampur, Bardhaman, a village in Kalna I block of Purba Bardhaman district, West Bengal, India
- Ghanasyampur, a village of South 24 Parganas, West Bengal, India
