= Ghanasyampur =

- Village
- Location in West Bengal Location in India
- Coordinates: 22.3166°N 88.2230°E
- Country: India
- State: West Bengal
- District: South 24 Parganas
- CD Block: Falta

Area
  - Total: 1.36 km^{2} (0.53 sq mi)
- Elevation: 8 m (26 ft)

Population (2011)
  - Total: 2,651
  - Density: 1,950/km^{2} (5,050/sq mi)

Languages
  - Official: Bengali
  - Additional official: English
- Time zone: UTC+5:30 (IST)
- PIN: 743504
- Telephone code: +91 3174
- Vehicle registration: WB-19 to WB-22, WB-95 to WB-99
- Lok Sabha constituency: Diamond Harbour
- Vidhan Sabha constituency: Falta
- Website: www.s24pgs.gov.in

Ghanasyampur is a village within the jurisdiction of the Falta police station in the Falta CD block in the Diamond Harbour subdivision of the South 24 Parganas district in the Indian state of West Bengal.

== Geography ==
Ghanasyampur is located at 22°19′00″N 88°13′23″E. It has an average elevation of 8 metres (26 ft).

== Demographics ==
As per 2011 Census of India, Ghanasyampur had a total population of 2,651.

== Transport ==
A short stretch of local roads link Ghanasyampur to the National Highway 12.

== Healthcare ==
Falta Block Primary Health Centre, with 10 beds, at Falta, is the major government medical facility in the Falta CD block.
