= Sangrampur =

Sangrampur may refer to the following places:

== India ==
- Sangrampur, Maharashtra
- Sangrampur, Unnao, Uttar Pradesh
- Sangrampur, Magrahat, South 24 Parganas district, West Bengal
  - Sangrampur railway station
- Sangrampur, Diamond Harbour, South 24 Parganas, West Bengal

== Nepal ==
- Sangrampur, Sarlahi
- Sangrampur, Rautahat

== See also ==
- Sangram (disambiguation)
