= Magrahat I =

Community Development Block in West Bengal, India

- Community Development Block
- Location of Magrahat I community development block in South 24 Parganas district
- Coordinates: 22.2420°N 88.3784°E
- Country: India
- State: West Bengal
- Division: Presidency
- District: South 24 Parganas
- Subdivision: Diamond Harbour
- Headquarters: Usthi

Government
  - Gram Panchayats: Ektara, Hariharpur, Kalikapota, Lakshmikantapur, Rangilbad, Sherpur, Shrichanda, Sirakol, Usthi, Uttarkusum, Yearpur
  - Lok Sabha constituencies: Mathurapur
  - Vidhan Sabha constituencies: Magrahat Paschim

Area
  - Total: 119.04 km^{2} (45.96 sq mi)

Population (2011)
  - Total: 269,494
  - Density: 2,263.9/km^{2} (5,863.5/sq mi)
  - Urban: 65,657

Demographics
  - Literacy: 73.82 per cent
  - Sex ratio: 951 ♂/♀

Languages
  - Official: Bengali
  - Additional official: English
- Time zone: UTC+05:30 (IST)
- Website: s24pgs.gov.in

Magrahat I is a community development block that forms an administrative division in Diamond Harbour subdivision of South 24 Parganas district in the Indian state of West Bengal.

== Geography ==

Magrahat I CD block is located at 22°14′31″N 88°22′42″E. It has an average elevation of 8 metres (26 ft).

Magrahat I CD block is bounded by Bishnupur I and Bishnupur II CD blocks in the north, Magrahat II CD block in the east, Mandirbazar and Kulpi CD blocks in the south, Diamond Harbour I and Falta CD blocks in the west.

South 24 Parganas district is divided into two distinct physiographic zones: the marine-riverine delta in the north and the marine delta zone in the south. As the sea receded southwards, in the sub-recent geological period, a large low-lying plain got exposed. Both tidal inflows and the rivers have deposited sediments in this plain. The periodical collapse of both the natural levees and man-made embankments speed up the process of filling up depressions containing brackish water wetlands. The marine delta in the south is formed of interlacing tidal channels. As non-saline water for irrigation is scarce, agriculture is monsoon-dominated. Some parts of the wetlands are still preserved for raising fish.

Magrahat I CD block has an area of 119.04 km^{2}. It has 1 panchayat samity, 11 gram panchayats, 186 gram sansads (village councils), 90 mouzas and 78 inhabited villages, as per the District Statistical Handbook, South Twenty-four Parganas. Sadasibpur village is located partly in Magrahat I and partly in Mandirbazar CD Block. Usthi police station serves this CD Block. Headquarters of this CD block is at Usthi.

Gram panchayats of Magrahat I CD block/panchayat samiti are: Ektara, Hariharpur, Kalikapota, Lakshmikantapur, Rangilbad, Sherpur, Shrichanda, Sirakol, Usthi, Uttarkusum and Yearpur.

== Demographics ==
=== Population ===
As per the 2011 Census of India, Magrahat I CD block had a total population of 269,494, of which 203,837 were rural and 65,657 were urban. There were 138,152 (51%) males and 131,342 (49%) females. Population below 6 years was 38,472. Scheduled Castes numbered 55,191 (20.48%) and Scheduled Tribes numbered 172 (0.08%).

As per the 2001 Census of India, Magrahat I CD block had a total population of 228,367, out of which 117,752 were males and 110,615 were females. Magrahat I CD block registered a population growth of 16.51% during the 1991-2001 decade. Decadal growth for South 24 Parganas district was 20.89%. Decadal growth in West Bengal was 17.84%. Scheduled Castes at 54,205 formed around one-fourth the population. Scheduled Tribes numbered 1,603.

Census Towns in Magrahat I CD block (2011 census figures in brackets): Ajodhyanagar (4,409), Sirakol (10,250), Uttar Bishnupur (4,703), Ghola Noapara (6,210), Usthi (6,230), Barijpur (5,536), Uttar Kusum (10,716), Kalikapota (13,086) and Bamna (4,517).

Large villages (with 4,000+ population) in Magrahat I CD block (2011 census figures in brackets): Iyarpur (9,238), Khela Rampur (6,176), Serpur (8,170), Kesili (4,167), Nainanpur (4,711), Nazra (9,552), Deula(5,169), Samashat (4,829), Tulyan (4,003), Khanpur (5,101) and Bahirpua (4,610).

Other villages in Magrahat I CD block include (2011 census figures in brackets): Srichanda (1,773), Rangilabad (3,459), Hariharpur (3,549), Ektara (2,604) and Baneswarpur (1960).

=== Literacy ===
As per the 2011 census, the total number of literates in Magrahat I CD block was 170,534 (77.41% of the population over 6 years) out of which males numbered 113,744 (83.62% of the male population over 6 years) and females numbered 91,045 (70.84% of the female population over 6 years). The gender disparity (the difference between female and male literacy rates) was 12.78%.

As per the 2011 Census of India, literacy in South 24 Parganas district was 77.51%. Literacy in West Bengal was 77.08% in 2011. Literacy in India in 2011 was 74.04%.

As per the 2001 Census of India, Magrahat I CD block had a total literacy of 67.34% for the 6+ age group. While male literacy was 77.39% female literacy was 56.54%. South 24 Parganas district had a total literacy of 69.45%, male literacy being 79.19% and female literacy being 59.01%.

See also – List of West Bengal districts ranked by literacy rate

Literacy in CD blocks of
South 24 Parganas district
Alipore Sadar subdivision
Bishnupur I – 78.33%
Bishnupur II – 81.37%
Budge Budge I – 80.57%
Budge Budge II – 79.13%
Thakurpukur Maheshtala – 83.54%
Baruipur subdivision
Baruipur – 76.46%
Bhangar I – 72.06%
Bhangar II – 74.49%
Jaynagar I – 73.17%
Jaynagar II – 69.71%
Kultali – 69.37%
Sonarpur – 79.70%
Canning subdivision
Basanti – 68.32%
Canning I – 70.76%
Canning II – 66.51%
Gosaba – 78.98%
Diamond Harbour subdivision
Diamond Harbour I – 75.72%
Diamond Harbour II – 76.91%
Falta – 77.17%
Kulpi – 75.49%
Magrahat I – 73.82%
Magrahat II – 77.41%
Mandirbazar – 75.89%
Mathurapur I – 73.93%
Mathurapur II – 77.77%
Kakdwip subdivision
Kakdwip – 77.93%
Namkhana – 85.72
Patharpratima – 82.11%
Sagar – 84.21%
Source: 2011 Census: CD Block Wise
Primary Census Abstract Data

=== Language ===
Languages of Magrahat I CD block (2011)
1. Bengali (99.9%)
2. Hindi (0.06%)
3. Urdu (0.02%)
4. Others (0.01%)

At the time of the 2011 census, 99.91% of the population spoke Bengali, 0.06% Hindi and 0.02% Urdu as their first language.

=== Religion ===
Religion in Magrahat I CD block (2011)
Islam	57.78%
Hinduism	40.44%
Christianity	1.50%
Other or not stated	0.28%

In the 2011 Census of India, Muslims numbered 155,700 and formed 57.78% of the population in Magrahat I CD block. Hindus numbered 108,987 and formed 40.44% of the population. Others numbered 4,807 and formed 1.78% of the population. Amongst the others, Christians numbered 4,035. In 2001, Muslims and Hindus were 55.26% and 43.06% of the population respectively, whiles Christians were 1.60% of the population.

The proportion of Hindus in South Twenty-four Parganas district has declined from 76.0% in 1961 to 63.2% in 2011. The proportion of Muslims in South Twenty-four Parganas district has increased from 23.4% to 35.6% during the same period. Christians formed 0.8% in 2011.

== Rural poverty ==
As per the Human Development Report for South 24 Parganas district, published in 2009, in Magrahat I CD block the percentage of households below poverty line was 28.41%, a moderate level of poverty. In the north-east and mid central portion of the district, all CD blocks, with the exception of Kulpi CD block, had poverty rates below 30%. As per rural household survey in 2005, the proportion of households in South 24 Parganas with poverty rates below poverty line was 34.11%, way above the state and national poverty ratios. The poverty rates were very high in the Sundarbans settlements with all thirteen CD blocks registering poverty ratios above 30% and eight CD blocks had more than 40% of the population in the BPL category.

== Economy ==
=== Livelihood ===
Livelihood
in Magrahat I CD block
1. Cultivators (8.38%)
2. Agricultural labourers (21.0%)
3. Household industries (17.1%)
4. Other Workers (53.5%)

In Magrahat I CD block in 2011, amongst the class of total workers, cultivators numbered 7,306 and formed 8.38%, agricultural labourers numbered 18,284 and formed 20.98%, household industry workers numbered 14,906 and formed 17.11% and other workers numbered 46,644 and formed 53.53%. Total workers numbered 87,140 and formed 32.33% of the total population, and non-workers numbered 182,354 and formed 67.67% of the population.

The District Human Development Report points out that in the blocks of region situated in the close proximity of the Kolkata metropolis, overwhelming majority are involved in the non-agricultural sector for their livelihood. On the other hand, in the Sundarban region, overwhelming majority are dependent on agriculture. In the intermediate region, there is again predominance of the non-agricultural sector. Though the region is not very close to Kolkata, many places are well connected and some industrial/ economic development has taken place.

Note: In the census records a person is considered a cultivator, if the person is engaged in cultivation/ supervision of land owned by self/government/institution. When a person who works on another person's land for wages in cash or kind or share, is regarded as an agricultural labourer. Household industry is defined as an industry conducted by one or more members of the family within the household or village, and one that does not qualify for registration as a factory under the Factories Act. Other workers are persons engaged in some economic activity other than cultivators, agricultural labourers and household workers. It includes factory, mining, plantation, transport and office workers, those engaged in business and commerce, teachers, entertainment artistes and so on.

=== Infrastructure ===
There are 78 inhabited villages in Magrahat I CD block, as per the District Census Handbook, South Twenty-four Parganas, 2011. 100% villages have power supply. 78 villages (100%) have drinking water supply. 25 villages (32.05%) have post offices. 73 villages (93.50%) have telephones (including landlines, public call offices and mobile phones). 25 villages (32.05%) have pucca (paved) approach roads and 34 villages (51.59%) have transport communication (includes bus service, rail facility and navigable waterways). 3 villages (3.85%) have agricultural credit societies and 7 villages (8.97%) have banks.

=== Agriculture ===
South 24 Parganas had played a significant role in the Tebhaga movement launched by the Communist Party of India in 1946. Subsequently, Operation Barga was aimed at securing tenancy rights for the peasants. In Magrahat I CD block 564.10 acres of land was acquired and vested. Out of this 452.21 acres or 80.16% of the vested land was distributed. The total number of patta (document) holders was 3,294.

According to the District Human Development Report, agriculture is an important source of livelihood in South Twentyfour Parganas district. The amount of cultivable land per agricultural worker is only 0.41 hectare in the district. Moreover, the irrigation facilities have not been extended to a satisfactory scale. Agriculture mostly remains a mono-cropped activity.

As per the District Census Handbook, the saline soil of the district is unfit for cultivation, but the non-salty lands are very fertile. While rice is the main food crop, jute is the main cash crop.

In 2013-14, there were 38 fertiliser depots, 16 seed stores and 50 fair price shops in Magrahat I CD block.

In 2013–14, Magrahat I CD block produced 14,241 tonnes of Aman paddy, the main winter crop, from 6,996 hectares, 137 tonnes of Aus paddy (summer crop) from 53 hectares, 11,272 tonnes of Boro paddy (spring crop) from 3,246 hectares, 804 tonnes of potatoes from 24 hectares. It also produced pulses and oilseeds.

=== Irrigation ===
In Magrahat I CD block, in 2013-14, 53.22 hectares were irrigated by river lift irrigation.

Poor irrigation and high soil salinity results in the mono-cropping pattern of cultivation in a major portion of the South 24 Parganas district. As a result of its closeness to the Bay of Bengal, the river waters are mostly saline and are unsuitable for irrigation. Added to the rather gloomy irrigation scenario is the problem of frequent floods.

=== Pisciculture ===
In Magrahat I CD block, in 2013-14, net area under effective pisciculture was 936 hectares, engaging 936 persons in the profession, and with an approximate annual production of 9,120 quintals.

Pisciculture is an important source of employment in South 24 Parganas district. As of 2001, more than 4.5 lakh people were engaged in Pisciculture. Out of this 2.57 lakhs were from the 13 blocks in the Sundarbans settlements.

=== Banking ===
In 2013-14, Magrahat I CD block had offices of 9 commercial banks and 1 gramin banks.

=== Backward Regions Grant Fund ===
South 24 Parganas district is listed as a backward region and receives financial support from the Backward Regions Grant Fund. The fund, created by the Government of India, is designed to redress regional imbalances in development. As of 2012, 272 districts across the country were listed under this scheme. The list includes 11 districts of West Bengal.

== Transport ==
Magrahat I CD block has 1 ferry service and 9 originating/ terminating bus routes.

Bahirpuya, Sangrampur and Deula are stations on the Sealdah South section.

== Education ==
In 2013-14, Magrahat I CD block had 113 primary schools with 14,410 students, 6 middle schools with 1,180 students, 7 high schools with 3,999 students and 19 higher secondary schools with 18,714 students. Magrahat I CD block had 1 general degree college with 496 students and 323 institutions for special and non-formal education with 19,017 students.

See also – Education in India

As per the 2011 census, in Magrahat I CD block, amongst the 78 inhabited villages, 3 villages did not have a school, 35 villages had two or more primary schools, 23 villages had at least 1 primary and 1 middle school and 16 villages had at least 1 middle and 1 secondary school.

Shirakole Mahavidyalaya was established in 2007 at Sirakol.

== Healthcare ==
In 2014, Magrahat I CD block had 1 rural hospital, 1 primary health centre and 3 private nursing homes with total 50 beds and 8 doctors (excluding private bodies). It had 31 family welfare subcentres. 3,496 patients were treated indoor and 73,527 patients were treated outdoor in the hospitals, health centres and subcentres of the CD block.

As per 2011 census, in Magrahat I CD block, 1 villages had a primary health centre, 29 villages had primary health subcentres, 15 villages had medicine shops and out of the 78 inhabited villages 32 villages had no medical facilities.

Baneswarpur Rural Hospital at Baneswarpur, with 30 beds, is the major government medical facility in Magrahat I CD block. There is a primary health centre at Sirakol (with 6 beds).
