= Baneshwarpur =

- Census Town
- Location in West Bengal Location in India
- Coordinates: 22.3108°N 88.2632°E
- Country: India
- State: West Bengal
- District: South 24 Parganas
- CD block: Falta

Area
  - Total: 2.07 km^{2} (0.80 sq mi)
- Elevation: 8 m (26 ft)

Population (2011)
  - Total: 4,741
  - Density: 2,290/km^{2} (5,930/sq mi)

Languages
  - Official: Bengali
  - Additional official: English
- Time zone: UTC+5:30 (IST)
- PIN: 743375
- Telephone code: +91 3174
- Vehicle registration: WB-19 to WB-22, WB-95 to WB-99
- Lok Sabha constituency: Diamond Harbour
- Vidhan Sabha constituency: Falta
- Website: www.s24pgs.gov.in

Baneshwarpur is a census town within the jurisdiction of the Falta police station in the Falta CD block in the Diamond Harbour subdivision of the South 24 Parganas district in the Indian state of West Bengal.

== Geography ==
Cities and towns in the western part of Diamond Harbour subdivision (including Falta, Diamond Harbour I & II, Kulpi CD blocks) in South 24 Parganas district
M: municipal city/ town, CT: census town, R: rural/ urban centre, N: neighbourhood, H: historical place/ religious centre
Owing to space constraints in the small map, the actual locations in a larger map may vary slightly

=== Area overview ===
Diamond Harbour subdivision is a rural subdivision with patches of urbanization. Only 14.61% of the population lives in the urban areas and an overwhelming 85.39% lives in the rural areas. In the western portion of the subdivision (shown in the map alongside) there are 11 census towns. The entire district is situated in the Ganges Delta and the western part, located on the east bank of the Hooghly River, is covered by the Kulpi Diamond Harbour Plain, which is 5–6 metres above sea level. Archaeological excavations at Deulpota and Harinarayanpur, on the bank of the Hooghly River indicate the existence of human habitation more than 2,000 years ago.

Note: The map alongside presents some of the notable locations in the subdivision. All places marked in the map are linked in the larger full screen map.

=== Location ===
Baneshwarpur is located at 22.3108°N 88.2632°E

Hasimnagar, Baneshwarpur of the Falta CD block and Ajodhyanagar, Sirakol of the Magrahat I CD block form a cluster of census towns.

== Demographics ==
According to the 2011 Census of India, Baneshwarpur had a total population of 4,741 of which 2,423 (51%) were males and 2,318 (49%) were females. There were 538 persons in the age range of 0–6 years. The total number of literate persons in Baneshwarpur was 3,507 (83.44% of the population over 6 years).

== Infrastructure ==
According to the District Census Handbook 2011, Baneshwarpur covered an area of 2.0718 km^{2}. Among the civic amenities, the protected water supply involved tap water from treated sources and hand pumps. It had 430 domestic electric connections. Among the medical facilities it had a dispensary/ health centre 4 km away. Among the educational facilities it had were 2 primary schools, 1 middle school, 1 secondary schools, 1 senior secondary school, the nearest general degree college at Sirakol 0.5 km away.

== Transport ==
Baneshwarpur is on the Sirakol-Usthi Road.

== Healthcare ==
Falta Block Primary Health Centre, with 10 beds, at Falta, is the major government medical facility in the Falta CD block.
