= Punya, Falta =

Punya
- Village
- Location in West Bengal Location in India
- Coordinates: 22.2956°N 88.1398°E
- Country: India
- State: West Bengal
- District: South 24 Parganas
- CD block: Falta

Area
  - Total: 0.83 km^{2} (0.32 sq mi)
- Elevation: 8 m (26 ft)

Population (2011)
  - Total: 2,583
  - Density: 3,100/km^{2} (8,100/sq mi)

Languages
  - Official: Bengali
  - Additional official: English
- Time zone: UTC+5:30 (IST)
- PIN: 743513
- Telephone code: +91 3174
- Vehicle registration: WB-19 to WB-22, WB-95 to WB-99
- Lok Sabha constituency: Diamond Harbour
- Vidhan Sabha constituency: Falta
- Website: www.s24pgs.gov.in

Punya is a village within the jurisdiction of the Falta police station in the Falta CD block in the Diamond Harbour subdivision of the South 24 Parganas district in the Indian state of West Bengal.

== Geography ==
Cities and towns in the western part of Diamond Harbour subdivision (including Falta, Diamond Harbour I & II, Kulpi CD blocks) in South 24 Parganas district
M: municipal city/ town, CT: census town, R: rural/ urban centre, N: neighbourhood, H: historical place/ religious centre
Owing to space constraints in the small map, the actual locations in a larger map may vary slightly

=== Area overview ===
Diamond Harbour subdivision is a rural subdivision with patches of urbanization. Only 14.61% of the population lives in the urban areas and an overwhelming 85.39% lives in the rural areas. In the western portion of the subdivision (shown in the map alongside) there are 11 census towns. The entire district is situated in the Ganges Delta and the western part, located on the east bank of the Hooghly River, is covered by the Kulpi Diamond Harbour Plain, which is 5–6 metres above sea level. Archaeological excavations at Deulpota and Harinarayanpur, on the bank of the Hooghly River indicate the existence of human habitation more than 2,000 years ago.

Note: The map alongside presents some of the notable locations in the subdivision. All places marked in the map are linked in the larger full screen map.

=== Location ===
Punya is located at 22.2956°N 88.1398°E

== Demographics ==
According to the 2011 Census of India, Punya had a total population of 2,583 of which 1,268 (51%) were males and 1,315 (51%) were females. There were 301 persons in the age range of 0 to 6 years. The total number of literate persons in Punya was 1,780 (78.00% of the population over 6 years).

== Transport ==
A short stretch of the Nainan Road links Punnya to the Fatepur-Falta Road. Fatepur is on National Highway 12 / Diamond Harbour Road. Nainan Road links to Falta SEZ Road, which links to Diamond Harbour Road.

== Education ==
L.J.D. College, Falta, established as a self-financed general degree college in 2015, is affiliated with the University of Calcutta. It is named in honour of late Lakshmi Rani Das and late Jitendranath Das. It offers honours courses in physics, chemistry, mathematics, botany, zoology, bio-chemistry, taxation, computer applications & e-business, accounting & finance, political science, history, education, Bengali and English.

LJD Law College, Falta, offers 5-year BA LlB courses.

LJD Public School, is an English-medium, coeducational 10+2 school following ICSE/ISC courses.

== Healthcare ==
Falta Block Primary Health Centre, with 10 beds, at Falta, is the major government medical facility in the Falta CD block.
