= Sankar Kumar Naskar =

Indian politician

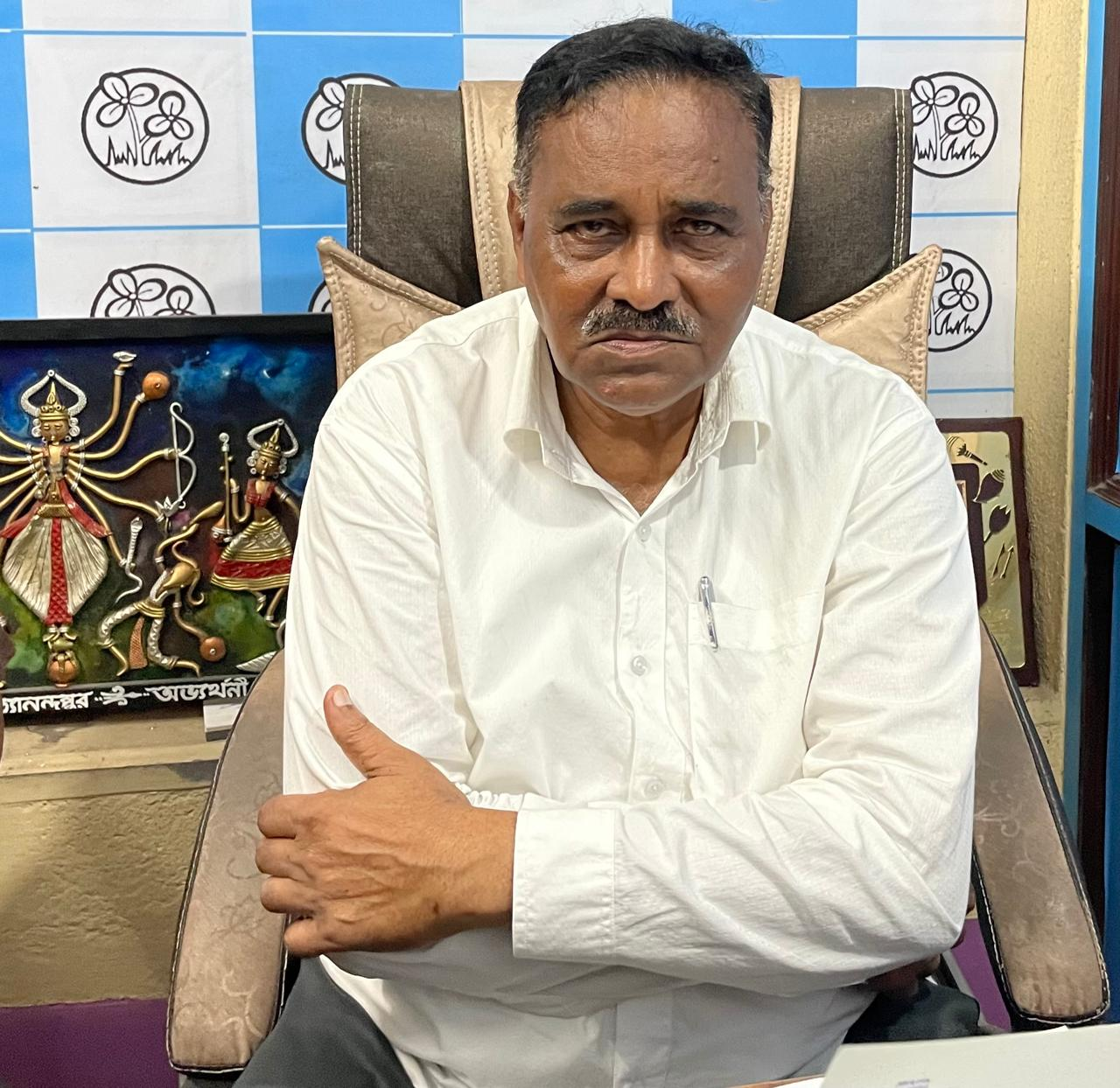
- Sankar Kumar Naskar

Member of the West Bengal Legislative Assembly
- In office 2 May 2021 – 7 May 2026
- Preceded by: Tamonash Ghosh
- Succeeded by: Debangshu Panda
- Constituency: Falta

Personal details
- Party: Trinamool Congress
- Profession: Politician

Sankar Kumar Naskar is an Indian politician member of Trinamool Congress. He was an MLA, elected from the Falta constituency in the 2021 West Bengal Legislative Assembly election.
