= Punya =

Puṇya (Sanskrit: पुण्य, 'merit') is a specific term used in Hinduism, Jainism and Buddhism which means virtue. A single act which creates a bundle of virtues is call Mahapunya means mega-virtue It has got several meanings.

- Punya (Hinduism)
- Punya (Jainism)
- Merit (Buddhism)

It may also refer to:

- Punya, Falta, a village in South 24 Parganas district, West Bengal, India
- Punya Nagari, a Marathi-language newspaper
