= Benapur =

- Village
- Location in West Bengal, India Benapur (India)
- Coordinates: 22.47°N 87.97°E
- Country: India
- State: West Bengal
- District: south 24 paraganas

Languages
  - Official: Bengali, English
- Time zone: UTC+5:30 (IST)
- Postal code: 743513
- Nearest city: Diamond Harbour, Kolkata
- Lok Sabha constituency: Diamond Harbour
- Vidhan Sabha constituency: Falta
- Website: howrah.gov.in

Benapur is a village in Bagnan-II Block, Howrah District, West Bengal. Its located beside the Rupnarayana River. Its Geographic location is 22.47°N 87.97°E.

The village is divided into North and South Benapur by the Nuntia-Benapur Road, a spur from the Bagnan-Gadiara Road from Nuntia.

== Economy ==
Farming (principally rice paddies and floriculture) forms the mainstay of the village economy, with jaba, golap, aparajita, and ganda flowers cultivated extensively. There are smaller industries producing bricks and, during the rainy season, the prized hilsa fish. Few years back, the village was very famous for producing 'pan', however, farmers are now less interested in it because of low production and other problems relating to environmental pollution mainly caused by brick industry.

== Education ==
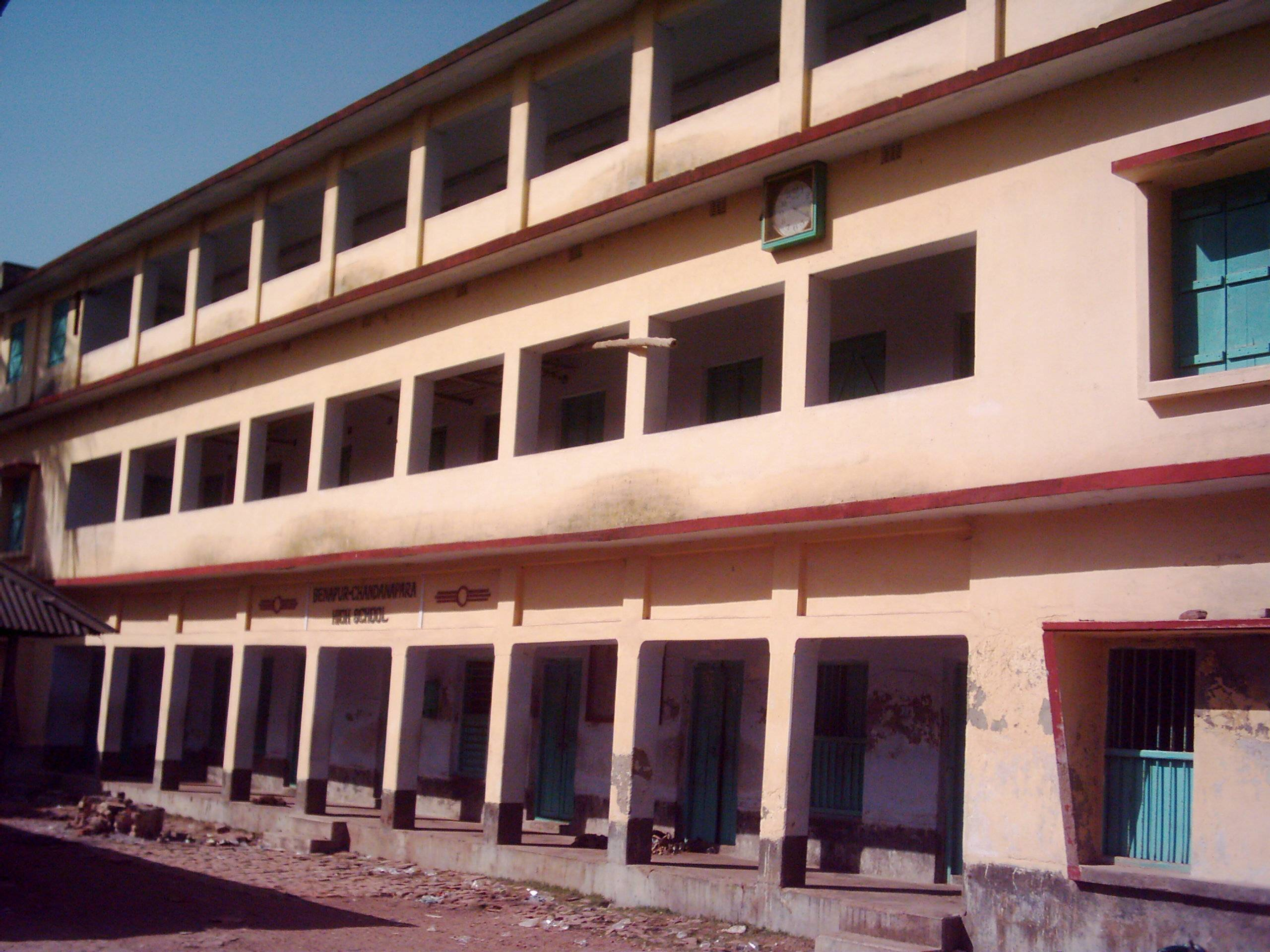
Benapur Chandanapara High School

Benapur has a long-standing educational history. Benapur Chandanapara High School (H.S.) is a prominent educational institution in Bagnan, noted for its alumni working across various professional fields.

== Religion ==
The village is predominantly Hindu, with local temples to the deities Shitala, Kali, and Shiva. Ma Jagaddhatri and Ma Basanti are worshipped in the village. Vishalakshmi is also an important goddess in this village.
