= Sirakol =

- Census Town
- Location in West Bengal Location in India
- Coordinates: 22.3158°N 88.2684°E
- Country: India
- State: West Bengal
- District: South 24 Parganas
- CD block: Magrahat I

Area
  - Total: 4.83 km^{2} (1.86 sq mi)
- Elevation: 8 m (26 ft)

Population (2011)
  - Total: 10,250
  - Density: 2,120/km^{2} (5,500/sq mi)

Languages
  - Official: Bengali
  - Additional official: English
- Time zone: UTC+5:30 (IST)
- PIN: 743513
- Telephone code: +91 3174
- Vehicle registration: WB-19 to WB-22, WB-95 to WB-99
- Lok Sabha constituency: Mathurapur (SC)
- Vidhan Sabha constituency: Magrahat Paschim
- Website: www.s24pgs.gov.in

Sirakol is a census town and a gram panchayat within the jurisdiction of the Usthi police station in the Magrahat I CD block in the Diamond Harbour subdivision of the South 24 Parganas district in the Indian state of West Bengal.

== Geography ==
Cities and towns in the eastern part of Diamond Harbour subdivision (including Magrahat I & II, Mandirbazar, Mathurapur I & II CD blocks) in South 24 Parganas district
M: municipal city/ town, CT: census town, R: rural/ urban centre, N: neighbourhood, T: religious centre
Owing to space constraints in the small map, the actual locations in a larger map may vary slightly

=== Area overview ===
Diamond Harbour subdivision is a rural subdivision with patches of urbanization. Only 14.61% of the population lives in the urban areas and an overwhelming 85.39% lives in the rural areas. In the eastern portion of the subdivision (shown in the map alongside) there are 24 census towns. The entire district is situated in the Ganges Delta and the eastern part of the district is a flat plain area with small towns, many in clusters. Location of places in the larger map varies a little. It is an OpenStreetMap, while we are using coordinates as in Google Maps.

Note: The map alongside presents some of the notable locations in the subdivision. All places marked in the map are linked in the larger full screen map.

=== Location ===
Sirakol is located at 22.3158°N 88.2684°E.

Hasimnagar, Baneshwarpur of the Falta CD block and Ajodhyanagar, Sirakol of the Magrahat I CD block form a cluster of census towns.

== Demographics ==
According to the 2011 Census of India, Sirakol had a total population of 10,250, of which 5,184 (51%) were males and 5,066 (49%) were females. There were 1,207 persons in the age range of 0–6 years. The total number of literate persons in Sirakol was 6,452 (71.35% of the population over 6 years).

== Infrastructure ==
According to the District Census Handbook 2011, Sirakol covered an area of 4.8335 km^{2}. Among the civic amenities, the protected water supply involved overhead tank. It had 917 domestic electric connections. Among the educational facilities it had were 4 primary schools, 1 secondary school, 1 senior secondary school and 1 general degree college.

== Social scenario ==
According to the District Human Development Report for the South 24 Parganas, "The district is typically at the lower rung of the ladder in terms of district per capita income compared to other districts of West Bengal… This place also houses the largest proportion of backward people compared to the state… So far as the crime scenario is concerned the economically weaker group, i.e. the women and children, suffer the most in this district."

== Transport ==
Sirakol is on the Sirakol-Usthi Road, just off the National Highway 12/ Diamond Harbour Road.

== Education ==
Shirakole Mahavidyalaya established in 2007, is affiliated with the University of Calcutta. It offers honours courses in Bengali, English, philosophy, political science, education, geography and history, and general courses in arts and commerce.

Shirakole YN High School is a Bengali-medium boys only institution established in 1948. It has facilities for teaching from class V to class XII.

Sirakole Girls High School is a Bengali-medium institution established in 1969. It has facilities for teaching from class V to class XII.

Sherpur Ramchandrapur High School is a coeducational institution.

== Healthcare ==
There is a primary health centre, with 6 beds, at Sirakol.
