= Sangram =

Sangram may refer to:

- Sampada Gramin Mahila Sanstha (SANGRAM), women organization in India
- Sangram (1946 film), a 1946 Indian Tamil-language film
- Sangram (1950 film), a 1950 Indian Hindi-language film
- Sangram (1968 film), a 1968 Indian Assamese-language film
- Sangram (1974 film), a 1974 Bangladeshi war film
- Sangram (1993 film), a 1993 Indian Hindi-language film
- Sangram (2001 film), a 2001 Pakistani film
- Sangram (2005 film), a 2005 Indian Bengali-language thriller film
- The Daily Sangram, or Dainik Sangram, a Bangladeshi newspaper
- Sangram Bhalerao "Simmba", fictional police inspector played by Ranveer Singh in the Indian Cop Universe media franchise

== See also ==
- Sangrampur (disambiguation)
- Sangrama (film), 1987 film directed by K. V. Raju
- Sangrama (Vidhan Sabha constituency), constituency of the Jammu and Kashmir Legislative Assembly, India
- Sangramaraja, a king of Kashmir
