= Giasuddin Molla =

Indian politician (born 1956)

Member of the West Bengal Legislative Assembly
- In office 20 May 2011 – 4 May 2026
- Preceded by: Abul Hasnat
- Succeeded by: Samim Ahmed
- Constituency: Magrahat Paschim

Minister of State of Minority Affairs and Madrasah Education, Government of West Bengal
- In office 2016–2021
- Preceded by: Md. Golam Rabanni
- Succeeded by: Mamata banerjee

Personal details
- Born: 1956 (age 69–70) Rajarhat, Diamond Harbour, West Bengal, India
- Party: All India Trinamool Congress (1998–present)
- Other political affiliations: Indian National Congress (till 1998)
- Spouse: Sabina Yasmin
- Children: 3
- Profession: Politician, businessman

Giasuddin Molla was the member of the Legislative Assembly from Magrahat Paschim (Vidhan Sabha constituency) in West Bengal.

== Career ==
In 1997, Mamata Banerjee left the Indian National Congress in West Bengal and founded the All India Trinamool Congress. Molla also left the Congress and joined the newly established Trinamool Congress. The party won 184 of 294 seats in the 2011 West Bengal Legislative Assembly election. Molla defeated Dr. Abul Hasnat of the Communist Party of India (Marxist) to win the seat. Molla is serving as Minister of State for Minority Affairs in the Government of West Bengal.
