= Md. Samim Ahamed Molla =

Indian politician in West Bengal

Member of the West Bengal Legislative Assembly
- Incumbent
- Assumed office 4 May 2026
- Preceded by: Giasuddin Molla
- Constituency: Magrahat Paschim

Personal details
- Party: Trinamool Congress
- Parent: MD Jaynal Abdin Molla
- Education: Suresh Gyan Vihar University
- Occupation: Junior Assistant
- Profession: Politician

Md. Samim Ahamed Molla (Bengali: মোঃ সামিম আহমেদ মোল্লা) is an Indian politician from West Bengal. He is a member of West Bengal Legislative Assembly, from Magrahat Paschim Assembly constituency. He is a member of Trinamool Congress.

== Early life and education ==
Molla is from Parulia, South 24 Parganas district of West Bengal. He has done Master of Business Administration from Suresh Gyan Vihar University in the year of 2023. His profession is Government Aided Service as Junior Assistant at Diamond Harbour Women's University (category UR).

== Political career ==
He is a member of West Bengal Legislative Assembly, from Magrahat Paschim Assembly constituency. Molla defeated Bharatiya Janata Party candidate Gour Sundar Ghosh by a margin of 58,503 votes from the said constituency.

=== Electoral performance ===
West Bengal Legislative Assembly
Year	Constituency	Party	Votes	%	Opponent	Party	Votes	%	Margin	Result
2026	Magrahat Paschim	AITC	113,834	55.43	Gour Sundar Ghosh	BJP	58,503	26.94	58,503	Won

== See also ==
- 2026 West Bengal Legislative Assembly election
- List of chief ministers of West Bengal
- West Bengal Legislative Assembly
