= Tamonash Ghosh =

Indian politician (1954 – 2020)

Tamonash Ghosh (1954 – 2020) was an Indian politician from West Bengal. He was a former member of the West Bengal Legislative Assembly from Falta Assembly constituency in South 24 Parganas district. He won the 2016 West Bengal Legislative Assembly election representing the All India Trinamool Congress. He died of COVID-19 on 24 June 2020.

== Early life and education ==
Ghosh was from Falta, South 24 Parganas district, West Bengal. He was the son of Durga Pada Ghosh. He completed his LLB at Ballygunge Law College in 1980. He had two daughters.

== Career ==
Ghosh won from Falta Assembly constituency representing the All India Trinamooll Congress in the 2016 West Bengal Legislative Assembly election. He polled 94,381 votes and defeated his nearest rival, Bidhan Parui of the Communist Party of India (Marxist), by a margin of 23,580 votes. He first became an MLA winning the Falta seat in the 2001 West Bengal Legislative Assembly election for Trinamool Congress. He won again in the 2011 West Bengal Legislative Assembly election and became a third time MLA in 2016. In 2011, he polled 86,966 votes and defeated his nearest rival, Ardhendu Sekhar Bindu of the Communist Party of India (Marxist), by a margin of 27,671 votes.

=== Death ===
Ghosh tested positive for COVID-19 in June 2020 during the first wave and was hospitalised at a private health facility. He died on 24 June 2020.
