= Debangshu Panda =

Indian politician in West Bengal

Member of the West Bengal Legislative Assembly
- Incumbent
- Assumed office 24 May 2026
- Preceded by: Sankar Kumar Naskar
- Constituency: Falta

Personal details
- Party: Bharatiya Janata Party
- Education: University of Calcutta (LLB)
- Profession: Politician

Debangshu Panda is an Indian politician from West Bengal. He is a member of West Bengal Legislative Assembly, from Falta Assembly constituency. He graduated from the University of Calcutta in 2006 with a Bachelor of Laws. His won by a landslide margin of 109021 votes from Left front candidate Sambhu Nath Kurmi is the highest margin of victory in the State in 2026 West Bengal Legislative Assembly election.
