= Abul Hasnat (Magrahat Paschim politician) =

Indian physician and politician (c.1955–2019)

Member of West Bengal Legislative Assembly
- In office 2006–2011
- Preceded by: Noorur Rahman
- Succeeded by: Giyas Uddin Molla
- Constituency: Magrahat Paschim

Personal details
- Born: 13 March 1951 Diamond Harbour
- Died: 11 June 2019 (aged 68)
- Party: Communist Party of India (Marxist)

Abul Hasnat (c. 1951 – 11 June 2019) was an Indian physician and politician. He was elected to the West Bengal Legislative Assembly in 2006 as MLA of Magrahat Paschim Vidhan Sabha constituency representing the CPI(M). He also contested from Diamond Harbour in 2014, but lost to Abhishek Banerjee of All India Trinamool Congress.

== Biography ==
Hasnat received an MBBS degree from University of Calcutta in 1976 and an MS degree from Patna University in 1981. He was elected as a member of the West Bengal Legislative Assembly from Magrahat Paschim in 2006.

Hasnat died on 11 June 2019 at the age of 64.
