= Ghanshyampur, Bardhaman =

Ghanshyampur
- Village
- Location in West Bengal, India Ghanshyampur (India)
- Country: India
- State: West Bengal
- District: Purba Bardhaman

Languages
  - Official: Bengali, English
- Time zone: UTC+5:30 (IST)
- Telephone/STD code: 03453

Ghanshyampur is a village in Kalna I block of Purba Bardhaman district in the Indian state of West Bengal.
