= Falta (community development block) =

Community Development Block in West Bengal, India

- Community Development Block
- Location of Falta community development block in South 24 Parganas district
- Coordinates: 22.3020°N 88.1284°E
- Country: India
- State: West Bengal
- Division: Presidency
- District: South 24 Parganas
- Subdivision: Diamond Harbour
- Headquarters: Harindanga

Government
  - Gram Panchayats: Banganagar-I, Banganagar-II, Belsingha-I, Belsingha-II, Chaluari, Debipur, Falta, Fatepur, Gopalpur, Harindanga-I, Harindanga-II, Mallikpur, Noyapukuria
  - Lok Sabha constituencies: Diamond Harbour
  - Vidhan Sabha constituencies: Falta

Area
  - Total: 130.68 km^{2} (50.46 sq mi)

Population (2011)
  - Total: 249,561
  - Density: 1,909.7/km^{2} (4,946.1/sq mi)
  - Urban: 23,399

Demographics
  - Literacy: 77.17 per cent
  - Sex ratio: 955 ♂/♀

Languages
  - Official: Bengali
  - Additional official: English
- Time zone: UTC+05:30 (IST)
- Website: s24pgs.gov.in

Falta is a community development block that forms an administrative division in Diamond Harbour subdivision of South 24 Parganas district in the Indian state of West Bengal.

== Geography ==

The Falta CD block is located at 22°18′07″N 88°07′42″E. It has an average elevation of 8 metres (26 ft).

The Falta CD block is bounded by the Budge Budge II and Bishnupur II CD blocks in the north, the Magrahat I CD block in the east, the Diamond Harbour I and Diamond Harbour II CD blocks in the south, the Shyampur I CD block in the Howrah district across the Hooghly, in the west.

The South 24 Parganas district is divided into two distinct physiographic zones: the marine-riverine delta in the north and the marine delta zone in the south. As the sea receded southwards, in the sub-recent geological period, a large low-lying plain got exposed. Both tidal inflows and the rivers have been depositing sediments in this plain. The periodical collapse of both the natural levees and man-made embankments speed up the process of filling up of the depressions containing Brackish Water wetlands. The marine delta in the south is formed of interlacing tidal channels. As non-saline water for irrigation is scarce, agriculture is monsoon dominated. Some parts of the wetlands are still preserved for raising fish.

The Falta CD block has an area of 130.68 km^{2}. It has 1 panchayat samity, 13 gram panchayats, 186 gram sansads (village councils), 133 mouzas and 129 inhabited villages, as per the District Statistical Handbook, South Twenty-four Parganas. Falta police station serves this CD Block. Headquarters of this CD block is at Harindanga.

Gram panchayats of Falta CD block/panchayat samiti are: Banganagar-I, Banganagar-II, Belsingha-I, Belsingha-II, Chaluari, Debipur, Falta, Fatepur, Gopalpur, Harindanga-I, Harindanga-II, Mallikpur and Noyapukuria.

== Demographics ==
=== Population ===
According to the 2011 Census of India, the Falta CD Block had a total population of 249,561, of which 226,162 were rural and 23,399 were urban. There were 127,665 (51%) males and 121,896 (49%) females. There were 28,715 persons in the age range of 0 to 6 years. The Scheduled Castes numbered 60,276 (24.15%) and the Scheduled Tribes numbered 87 (0.03%).

According to the 2001 Census of India, the Falta CD block had a total population of 221,589, out of which 114,207 were males and 107,382 were females. The Falta CD block registered a population growth of 11.64 per cent during the 1991-2001 decade. Decadal growth for the South 24 Parganas district was 20.89 per cent. Decadal growth in West Bengal was 17.84 per cent. The Scheduled Castes at 56,817 formed around one-fourth the population. The Scheduled Tribes numbered 1,623.

Census Towns in the Falta CD block (2011 census figures in brackets): Hasimnagar (5,267), Baneshwarpur (4,741), Chandpala Anantapathpur (5,286) and Fatepur (8,105).

Large villages (with 4,000+ population) in the Falta CD block (2011 census figures in brackets): Mamudpur (4,037), Rajarampur (7,548), Chak Dhanumandal Krishnarambasu (4,011), Basulat (4,963), Chandideul (4,631), Iswaripur (4,127), Belsingha (4,401), Chaluary (4,708), Banganagar (4,469) and Zafarpur (6,457).

Other villages in the Falta block include (2011 census figures in brackets): Falta (959), Mallikpur (1,307), Noapukhuria (1,882), Harindanga (2,171), Debipur (3,803) and Punya (1,266).

=== Literacy ===
According to the 2011 census, the total number of literate persons in Falta CD block was 170,430 (77.17% of the population over 6 years) out of which males numbered 93,829 (83.00% of the male population over 6 years) and females numbered 76,601 (71.06% of the female population over 6 years). The gender disparity (the difference between female and male literacy rates) was 11.94%.

According to the 2011 Census of India, literacy in the South 24 Parganas district was 77.51 Literacy in West Bengal was 77.08% in 2011. Literacy in India in 2011 was 74.04%.

According to the 2001 Census of India, the Falta CD block had a total literacy of 71.89 per cent for the 6+ age group. While male literacy was 81.25 per cent female literacy was 61.86 per cent. The South 24 Parganas district had a total literacy of 69.45 per cent, male literacy being 79.19 per cent and female literacy being 59.01 per cent.

See also – List of West Bengal districts ranked by literacy rate

Literacy in CD blocks of
South 24 Parganas district
Alipore Sadar subdivision
Bishnupur I – 78.33%
Bishnupur II – 81.37%
Budge Budge I – 80.57%
Budge Budge II – 79.13%
Thakurpukur Maheshtala – 83.54%
Baruipur subdivision
Baruipur – 76.46%
Bhangar I – 72.06%
Bhangar II – 74.49%
Jaynagar I – 73.17%
Jaynagar II – 69.71%
Kultali – 69.37%
Sonarpur – 79.70%
Canning subdivision
Basanti – 68.32%
Canning I – 70.76%
Canning II – 66.51%
Gosaba – 78.98%
Diamond Harbour subdivision
Diamond Harbour I – 75.72%
Diamond Harbour II – 76.91%
Falta – 77.17%
Kulpi – 75.49%
Magrahat I – 73.82%
Magrahat II – 77.41%
Mandirbazar – 75.89%
Mathurapur I – 73.93%
Mathurapur II – 77.77%
Kakdwip subdivision
Kakdwip – 77.93%
Namkhana – 85.72
Patharpratima – 82.11%
Sagar – 84.21%
Source: 2011 Census: CD Block Wise
Primary Census Abstract Data

=== Language ===
Languages of Falta CD block (2011)
1. Bengali (99.9%)
2. Hindi (0.06%)
3. Urdu (0.02%)
4. Others (0.01%)

At the time of the 2011 census, 99.91% of the population spoke Bengali, 0.06% Hindi and 0.02% Urdu as their first language.

=== Religion ===
Religion in Falta CD block (2011)
Hinduism	66.15%
Islam	33.10%
Other or not stated	0.13%

In the 2011 Census of India, Hindus numbered 168,873 and formed 66.15% of the population in the Falta CD block. Muslims numbered 87,352 and formed 33.10% of the population. Others numbered 336 and formed 0.13% of the population. In 2001, Hindus and Muslims were 68.12% and 31.80% of the population respectively.

The proportion of Hindus in the South Twenty-four Parganas district has declined from 76.0% in 1961 to 63.2% in 2011. The proportion of Muslims in the South Twenty-four Parganas district has increased from 23.4% to 35.6% during the same period. Christians formed 0.8% in 2011.

== Rural poverty ==
According to the Human Development Report for the South 24 Parganas district, published in 2009, in the Falta CD block the percentage of households below poverty line was 21.56%, a moderate level of poverty. In the north-east and mid central portion of the district, all CD blocks, with the exception of the Kulpi CD block, had poverty rates below 30%. As per rural household survey in 2005, the proportion of households in the South 24 Parganas with poverty rates below poverty line was 34.11%, way above the state and national poverty ratios. The poverty rates were very high in the Sundarbans settlements with all the thirteen CD blocks registering poverty ratios above 30% and eight CD blocks had more than 40% of the population in the BPL category.

== Economy ==
=== Livelihood ===
Livelihood
in Falta CD block
1. Cultivators (9.08%)
2. Agricultural labourers (27.9%)
3. Household industries (8.55%)
4. Other Workers (54.5%)

In the Falta CD block in 2011, among the class of total workers, cultivators numbered 8,048 and formed 9.08%, agricultural labourers numbered 24,712 and formed 27.89%, household industry workers numbered 7,578 and formed 8.55% and other workers numbered 48,272 and formed 54.48%. Total workers numbered 88,608 and formed 35.51% of the total population, and non-workers numbered 160,953 and formed 64.49% of the population.

The District Human Development Report points out that in the blocks of the region situated in the close proximity of the Kolkata metropolis, overwhelming majority are involved in the non-agricultural sector for their livelihood. On the other hand, in the Sundarban region, overwhelming majority are dependent on agriculture. In the intermediate region, there is again predominance of the non-agricultural sector. Though the region is not very close to Kolkata, many places are well connected and some industrial/ economic development has taken place.

Note: In the census records a person is considered a cultivator, if the person is engaged in cultivation/ supervision of land owned by self/government/institution. When a person who works on another person's land for wages in cash or kind or share, is regarded as an agricultural labourer. Household industry is defined as an industry conducted by one or more members of the family within the household or village, and one that does not qualify for registration as a factory under the Factories Act. Other workers are persons engaged in some economic activity other than cultivators, agricultural labourers and household workers. It includes factory, mining, plantation, transport and office workers, those engaged in business and commerce, teachers, entertainment artistes and so on.

=== Infrastructure ===
There are 129 inhabited villages in the Falta CD block, as per the District Census Handbook, South Twenty-four Parganas, 2011. 100% villages have power supply. 128 villages (99.22%) have drinking water supply. 22 villages (17.05%) have post offices. 129 villages (100%) have telephones (including landlines, public call offices and mobile phones). 31 villages (24.03%) have pucca (paved) approach roads and 44 villages (34.11%) have transport communication (includes bus service, rail facility and navigable waterways). 2 villages (1.55%) have agricultural credit societies and 7 villages (5.43%) have banks.

=== Agriculture ===
The South 24 Parganas had played a significant role in the Tebhaga movement launched by the Communist Party of India in 1946. Subsequently, Operation Barga was aimed at securing tenancy rights for the peasants. In the Falta CD block 742.19 acres of land was acquired and vested. Out of this 395.71 acres or 53.82% of the vested land was distributed. The total number of patta (document) holders was 2,256.

According to the District Human Development Report, agriculture is an important source of livelihood in the South Twentyfour Parganas district. The amount of cultivable land per agricultural worker is only 0.41 hectare in the district. Moreover, the irrigation facilities have not been extended to a satisfactory scale. Agriculture mostly remains a mono-cropped activity.

According to the District Census Handbook, the saline soil of the district is unfit for cultivation, but the non-salty lands are very fertile. While rice is the main food crop, jute is the main cash crop.

In 2013–14, there were 54 fertiliser depots, 29 seed stores and 43 fair price shops in the Falta CD block.

In 2013–14, the Falta CD block produced 1,532 tonnes of Aman paddy, the main winter crop, from 1,342 hectares, 13,930 tonnes of Boro paddy (spring crop) from 3,852 hectares. It also produced pulses.

=== Irrigation ===
In the Falta CD block, in 2013–14, 29.20 hectares were irrigated by river lift irrigation and 35.18 hectares by deep tube wells.

Poor irrigation and high soil salinity results in the mono-cropping pattern of cultivation in a major portion of the South 24 Parganas district. As a result of its closeness to the Bay of Bengal, the river waters are mostly saline and are unsuitable for irrigation. Added to the rather gloomy irrigation scenario is the problem of frequent floods.

=== Pisciculture ===
In the Falta CD block, in 2013–14, net area under effective pisciculture was 680 hectares, engaging 6,511 persons in the profession, and with an approximate annual production of 106,472 quintals.

Pisciculture is an important source of employment in the South 24 Parganas district. As of 2001, more than 4.5 lakh people were engaged in pisciculture. Out of this 2.57 lakhs were from the 13 blocks in the Sundarbans settlements.

=== Banking ===
In 2013–14, the Falta CD block had offices of 5 commercial banks and 3 gramin banks.

=== Backward Regions Grant Fund ===
The South 24 Parganas district is listed as a backward region and receives financial support from the Backward Regions Grant Fund. The fund, created by the Government of India, is designed to redress regional imbalances in development. As of 2012, 272 districts across the country were listed under this scheme. The list includes 11 districts of West Bengal.

== Transport ==
The Falta CD block has 2 ferry services, 9 originating/ terminating bus routes. The nearest railway station is 20 km from the block headquarters.

== Education ==
In 2013–14, the Falta CD block had 148 primary schools with 11,264 students, 3 middle schools with 263 students, 19 high schools with 7,411 students and 14 higher secondary schools with 9,895 students. The Falta CD block had 1 general degree college with 895 students and 358 institutions for special and non-formal education with 15,139 students.

See also – Education in India

According to the 2011 census, in the Falta CD block, among the 129 inhabited villages, 5 villages did not have a school, 49 villages had two or more primary schools, 41 villages had at least 1 primary and 1 middle school and 32 villages had at least 1 middle and 1 secondary school.

- Sadhan Chandra Mahavidyalaya was established at Harindanga in 2007.
- L.J.D. College was established at Punya, PO Saharahat, in 2015.

== Healthcare ==
In 2014, the Falta CD block had 1 block primary health centre, 1 primary health centre and 15 private nursing homes with total 104 beds and 23 doctors (excluding private bodies). It had 30 family welfare subcentres. 2,132 patients were treated indoor and 95,472 patients were treated outdoor in the hospitals, health centres and subcentres of the CD block.

According to the 2011 census, in the Falta CD block, 1 village had a primary health centre, 26 villages had primary health subcentres, 20 villages had medicine shops and out of the 129 inhabited villages 38 villages had no medical facilities.

Falta Block Primary Health Centre at Falta, with 10 beds, is the major government medical facility in the Falta CD block. There is a primary health centre at Dholtikuri (PO Charberia) (with 6 beds).
