= Falta, South 24 Parganas =

Falta
- Village
- Location in West Bengal Location in India
- Coordinates: 22.3020°N 88.1284°E
- Country: India
- State: West Bengal
- District: South 24 Parganas
- CD block: Falta

Area
  - Total: 0.36 km^{2} (0.14 sq mi)
- Elevation: 8 m (26 ft)

Population (2011)
  - Total: 969
  - Density: 2,700/km^{2} (7,000/sq mi)

Languages
  - Official: Bengali
  - Additional official: English
- Time zone: UTC+5:30 (IST)
- PIN: 743504
- Telephone code: +91 3174
- Vehicle registration: WB-19 to WB-22, WB-95 to WB-99
- Lok Sabha constituency: Diamond Harbour
- Vidhan Sabha constituency: Falta
- Website: www.s24pgs.gov.in

Falta is a village and a gram panchayat within the jurisdiction of the Falta police station in the Falta CD block in the Diamond Harbour subdivision of the South 24 Parganas district in the Indian state of West Bengal.

== History ==
Falta was an old human settlement of pre-British India. When Siraj-ud-Daulah sacked Kolkata in 1756, the English residents moved to Falta temporarily.

== Geography ==
Cities and towns in the western part of Diamond Harbour subdivision (including Falta, Diamond Harbour I & II, Kulpi CD blocks) in South 24 Parganas district
M: municipal city/ town, CT: census town, R: rural/ urban centre, N: neighbourhood, H: historical place/ religious centre
Owing to space constraints in the small map, the actual locations in a larger map may vary slightly

=== Area overview ===
Diamond Harbour subdivision is a rural subdivision with patches of urbanization. Only 14.61% of the population lives in the urban areas and an overwhelming 85.39% lives in the rural areas. In the western portion of the subdivision (shown in the map alongside) there are 11 census towns. The entire district is situated in the Ganges Delta and the western part, located on the east bank of the Hooghly River, is covered by the Kulpi Diamond Harbour Plain, which is 5–6 metres above sea level. Archaeological excavations at Deulpota and Harinarayanpur, on the bank of the Hooghly River indicate the existence of human habitation more than 2,000 years ago.

Note: The map alongside presents some of the notable locations in the subdivision. All places marked in the map are linked in the larger full screen map.

=== Location ===
Falta is located at 22°18′07″N 88°07′42″E. It has an average elevation of 8 metres (26 ft).

== Demographics ==
According to the 2011 Census of India, Falta had a total population of 969, of which 490 (51%) were males and 479 (49%) were females. There were 113 persons in the age range of 0–6 years. The total number of literate persons in Falta was 719 (84.00% of the population over 6 years).

== Civic administration ==
=== Police station ===
Falta police station was established in 1906. It covers an area of 135.58 sq km spread over the Falta CD block.

== Economy ==
An Export Processing Zone (EPZ) was established by the government of India at Falta in 1984. It later became a Free Trade Zone (FTZ) and subsequently became a Special Economic Zone (SEZ) under the West Bengal SEZ Act, 2003. It was the first SEZ act passed by any state government in India. Therefore, the Falta SEZ was the first SEZ in India. After the government of India passed the SEZ Act in 2005, the Falta SEZ came under the purview of this act. A Special Economic Zone is a specially delineated duty-free enclave and is deemed to be foreign territory for the purpose of trade operations and duties and tariffs. The units in the Zone have to export their entire production and are granted certain entitlements.

Falta SEZ was set up over 280 acres of land It has 271 companies, of which 107 are closed. About 60% of the workforce in the SEZ are women. In 2003-04, export from Falta stood at about Rs 1,500 crore,

== Transport ==
A short stretch of local roads link Falta to the National Highway 12.

== Healthcare ==
Falta Block Primary Health Centre at Falta, with 10 beds, is the major government medical facility in the Falta CD block.

== Gallery ==
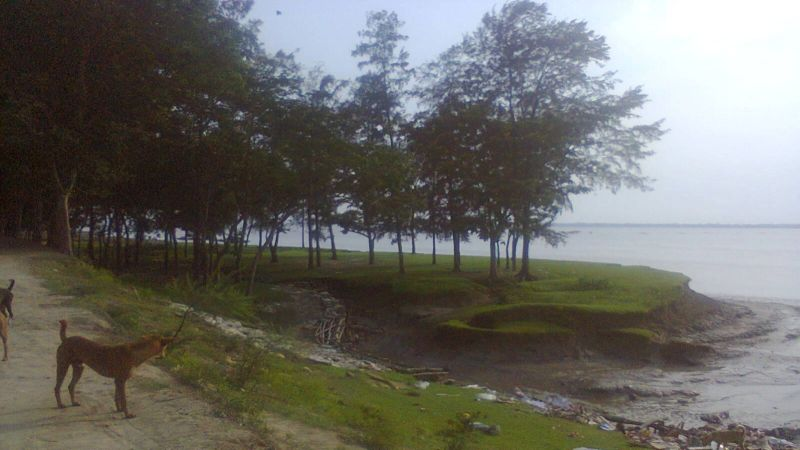
Falta River Side. Tourist Place Opposite Ritz Ravera

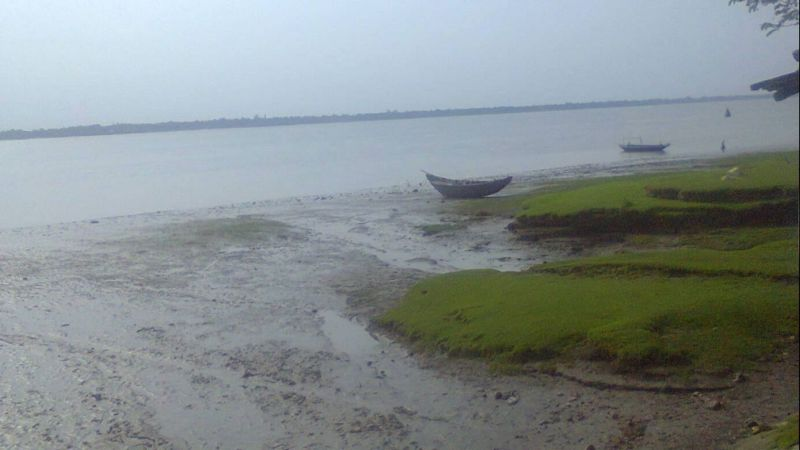
Falta River Side. Tourist Place Opposite Ritz Ravera

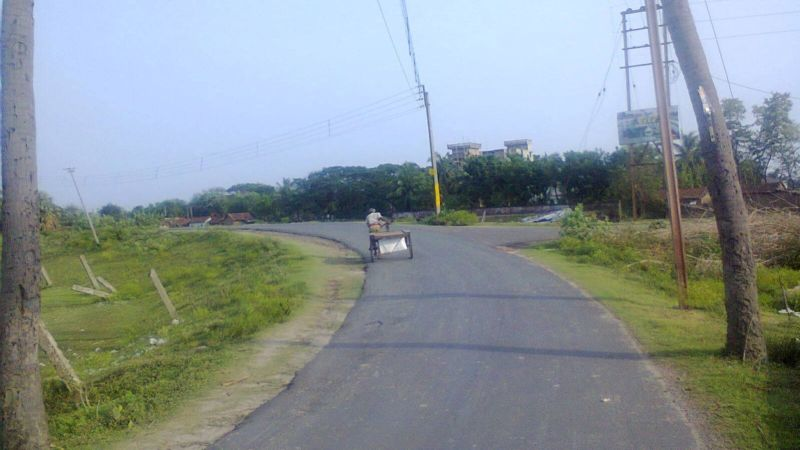
Falta - Nainan Road
