= Baneswarpur =

- Village
- Location in West Bengal Location in India
- Coordinates: 22.2575°N 88.2934°E
- Country: India
- State: West Bengal
- District: South 24 Parganas
- CD block: Magrahat I

Area
  - Total: 0.37 km^{2} (0.14 sq mi)
- Elevation: 8 m (26 ft)

Population (2011)
  - Total: 1,960
  - Density: 5,300/km^{2} (14,000/sq mi)

Languages
  - Official: Bengali
  - Additional official: English
- Time zone: UTC+5:30 (IST)
- PIN: 743375
- Telephone code: +91 3174
- Vehicle registration: WB-19 to WB-22, WB-95 to WB-99
- Lok Sabha constituency: Mathurapur (SC)
- Vidhan Sabha constituency: Magrahat Paschim
- Website: www.s24pgs.gov.in

Baneswarpur is a village within the jurisdiction of the Usthi police station in the Magrahat I CD block in the Diamond Harbour subdivision of the South 24 Parganas district in the Indian state of West Bengal.

== Geography ==
Cities and towns in the eastern part of Diamond Harbour subdivision (including Magrahat I & II, Mandirbazar, Mathurapur I & II CD blocks) in South 24 Parganas district
M: municipal city/ town, CT: census town, R: rural/ urban centre, N: neighbourhood, T: religious site
Owing to space constraints in the small map, the actual locations in a larger map may vary slightly

=== Area overview ===
Diamond Harbour subdivision is a rural subdivision with patches of urbanization. Only 14.61% of the population lives in urban areas and an overwhelming 85.39% lives in the rural areas. In the eastern portion of the subdivision (shown in the map alongside) there are 24 census towns. The entire district is situated in the Ganges Delta and the eastern part of the district is a flat plain area with small towns, many in clusters. Location of places in the larger map varies a little. It is an OpenStreetMap, while we are using coordinates as in Google Maps.

Note: The map alongside presents some of the notable locations in the subdivision. All places marked in the map are linked in the larger full screen map.

=== Location ===
Baneswarpur is located at 22.2575°N 88.2934°E.

== Demographics ==
According to the 2011 Census of India, Baneswarpur had a total population of 1,960, of which 1,028 (52%) were males and 932 (48%) were females. There were 257 persons in the age range of 0–6 years. The total number of literate persons in Baneswarpur was 1,375 (80.74% of the population over 6 years).

== Transport ==
Baneswarpur is on the Sangrampur-Samashat Road.

== Healthcare ==
Baneswarpur Rural Hospital, with 30 beds, is the major government medical facility in the Magrahat I CD block.
