= Falta Assembly constituency =

West Bengal Legislative Assembly constituency

Falta
- Constituency No. 144 for the West Bengal Legislative Assembly
- Interactive Map Outlining Falta Assembly Constituency

Constituency details
- Country: India
- Region: East India
- State: West Bengal
- District: South 24 Parganas
- Lok Sabha constituency: Diamond Harbour
- Established: 1951
- Total electors: 236,667
- Reservation: None

Member of Legislative Assembly
- 18th West Bengal Legislative Assembly
- Incumbent Debangshu Panda
- Party: BJP
- Alliance: NDA
- Elected year: 2026

Falta Assembly constituency is a Legislative Assembly constituency of South 24 Parganas district in the Indian State of West Bengal.

== Overview ==
Party-wise wins in Falta Assembly constituency
1. Communist Party of India (Marxist) (8) (44.4%)
2. Indian National Congress (4) (22.2%)
3. All India Trinamool Congress (4) (22.2%)
4. Communist Party of India (1) (5.55%)
5. Bharatiya Janata Party (1) (5.55%)

Vote share of winning candidates
2026	71.20%
2021	56.35%
2016	50.15%
2011	55.61%
2006	45.70%
2001	43.55%

As per order of the Delimitation Commission in respect of the Delimitation of constituencies in the West Bengal, Falta Assembly constituency is composed of the following:

- Falta community development block
- Bhadura Haridas and Kalatalahat gram panchayats of Diamond Harbour II community development block

Falta Assembly constituency is a part of No. 21 Diamond Harbour Lok Sabha constituency.

== Members of the Legislative Assembly ==
Year	Name	Party
1952	Jyotish Chandra Roy	Communist Party of India
1957	Khagendra Nath Das	Indian National Congress
1962	Khagendra Nath Das	Indian National Congress
1967	Jyotish Chandra Roy	Communist Party of India (Marxist)
1969	Jyotish Chandra Roy	Communist Party of India (Marxist)
1971	Jyotish Chandra Roy	Communist Party of India (Marxist)
1972	Mohini Mohan Parui	Indian National Congress
1977	Nimai Chandra Das	Communist Party of India (Marxist)
1982	Nimai Chandra Das	Communist Party of India (Marxist)
1987	Arati Dasgupta	Communist Party of India (Marxist)
1991	Arati Dasgupta	Communist Party of India (Marxist)
1996	Sudhir Bhattacharya	Indian National Congress
2001	Tamonash Ghosh	Trinamool Congress
2006	Chandana Ghosh Dastidar	Communist Party of India (Marxist)
2011	Tamonash Ghosh	Trinamool Congress
2016	Tamonash Ghosh	Trinamool Congress
2021	Shankar Kumar Naskar	Trinamool Congress
2026	Debangshu Panda	Bharatiya Janata Party

== Election results ==
=== 2026 ===
2026 West Bengal Legislative Assembly election: Falta
Party	Candidate	Votes	%	±%
BJP	Debangshu Panda	149,666	71.20	▲34.45
CPI(M)	Sambhu Nath Kurmi	40,645	19.34	New entry
INC	Abdur Razzak Molla	10,084	4.80	▲1.22
AITC	Jahangir Khan (Note: AITC candidate Jahangir Khan withdrew himself from the election. However, since as per ECI schedule, last date to withdraw name was 13 April 2026, so the candidate's name still appeared on the EVM.)	7,783	3.70	▼52.65
Independent	Chandrakanta Roy	983	0.47	New entry
NOTA	None of the above	784	0.37	▼0.20
Independent	Dip Hati	247	0.12	New entry
Majority		1,09,021	51.86	▲32.26
Turnout		2,10,192	88.13	▲0.31
BJP gain from AITC		Swing		

=== 2021 ===
2021 West Bengal Legislative Assembly election: Falta
Party	Candidate	Votes	%	±%
AITC	Shankar Kumar Naskar	117,179	56.35	▲6.20
BJP	Bidhan Parui	76,405	36.75	▲28.37
INC	Abdur Razzak Molla	7,452	3.58	New entry
Independent	Mohammad Raquibul Hasan	1,677	0.81	New entry
NOTA	None of the Above	1,185	0.57	▼0.39
Majority		40,774	19.6	▲7.07
Turnout		2,07,932	87.82	▼0.8
AITC hold		Swing		

=== 2016 ===
2016 West Bengal Legislative Assembly election: Falta
Party	Candidate	Votes	%	±%
AITC	Tamonash Ghosh	94,381	50.15	▼5.46
CPI(M)	Bidhan Parui	70,801	37.62	▼0.3
BJP	Amarendra Nath Mukherjee	15,763	8.38	▲4.93
NOTA	None of the Above	1,813	0.96	New entry
Majority		23,580	12.53	▼5.16
Turnout		1,88,183	88.62	▲2.98
AITC hold		Swing		

=== 2011 ===
2011 West Bengal Legislative Assembly election: Falta
Party	Candidate	Votes	%	±%
AITC	Tamonash Ghosh	86,966	55.61	
CPI(M)	Ardhendu Shekhar Bindu	59,295	37.92	
BJP	Ajit Kumar Haldar	5,389	3.45	
Independent	Gautam Dalui	2,886	1.85	
BSP	Chittaranjan Malik	1,839	1.18	
Majority		27,671	17.69	
Turnout		1,56,375	85.64	
AITC gain from CPI(M)		Swing		

=== 2006 ===
2006 West Bengal Legislative Assembly election: Falta
Party	Candidate	Votes	%	±%
CPI(M)	Chandana Ghoshdastidar	51,814	45.70	+4.28
AITC	Tamonash Ghosh	50,060	44.16	+0.61
INC	Sudhir Bhattacherjee	11,494	10.14	New entry
Majority		1,754	1.55	−0.58
Turnout		113,368		
CPI(M) gain from AITC		Swing		

=== 2001 ===
2001 West Bengal Legislative Assembly election: Falta
Party	Candidate	Votes	%	±%
AITC	Tamonash Ghosh	43,697	43.55	
CPI(M)	Malina Mistry	41,559	41.42	
NCP	Sudhir Bhattacharjee	9,931	9.90	
BJP	Bitan Mondal	2,908	2.90	
Independent	Sukdev Pramanik	1,417	1.41	
Majority		2,138	2.13	
Turnout		100,332	72.24	
AITC gain from CPI(M)		Swing		

=== 1977-2006 ===
In 2006, Chandana Ghosh Dastidar of CPI(M) won the Falta Assembly constituency defeating her nearest rival Tamonash Ghosh of AITC. Tamonash Ghosh of AITC defeated Malina Mistry of CPI(M) in 2001. Sudhir Bhattacharya of INC defeated Arati Dasgupta of CPI(M) in 1996. Arati Dasgupta of CPI(M) defeated Sudhir Bhattacharya of INC in 1991 and Dinabandhu Halder of INC in 1987. Nimai Chandra Das of CPI(M) defeated Asraf Ali of INC in 1982 and Mohini Mohan Parui of INC in 1977.

=== 1952-1972 ===
Mohini Mohan Parui of INC won in 1972. Jyotish Chandra Roy of CPI(M) won in 1971, 1969 and 1967. Khagendra Nath Das of INC won in 1962 and 1957. Jyotish Chandra Roy of CPI won in 1952.
