= Magrahat Paschim Assembly constituency =

Constituency of the West Bengal Legislative Assembly, in India

Magrahat Paschim
- Constituency No. 142 for the West Bengal Legislative Assembly
- Interactive Map Outlining Magrahat Paschim Assembly Constituency

Constituency details
- Country: India
- Region: East India
- State: West Bengal
- District: South 24 Parganas
- Lok Sabha constituency: Mathurapur
- Established: 1951
- Total electors: 229,354
- Reservation: None

Member of Legislative Assembly
- 18th West Bengal Legislative Assembly
- Incumbent Md. Samim Ahamed Molla
- Party: AITC
- Alliance: AITC+
- Elected year: 2026

Magrahat Paschim Assembly constituency is a Legislative Assembly constituency of South 24 Parganas district in the Indian State of West Bengal.

== Overview ==
As per order of the Delimitation Commission in respect of the Delimitation of constituencies in West Bengal, Magrahat Paschim Assembly constituency is composed of the following:

- Magrahat I community development block
- Netra gram panchayat of Diamond Harbour I community development block

Magrahat Paschim Assembly constituency is a part of No. 20 Mathurapur Lok Sabha constituency.

== Members of the Legislative Assembly ==
Year	Name	Party
1952	Abdul Hashem	Indian National Congress
1952	Ardhendu Sekhar Naskar	Indian National Congress
1957	Abdul Hashem	Indian National Congress
1957	Ardhendu Sekhar Naskar	Indian National Congress
1962	Abdul Hashem (Magrahat Paschim)	Indian National Congress
1967	Jainul Abedin	Bangla Congress
1969	Sachindranath Mondal	Bangla Congress
1971	Sudhendu Mundle	Bangla Congress
1972	Sudhendu Mundle	Indian National Congress
1977	Abdus Sobhan Gazi	Communist Party of India (Marxist)
1982	Abdus Sobhan Gazi	Communist Party of India (Marxist)
1987	Abdus Sobhan Gazi	Communist Party of India (Marxist)
1991	Anuradha Putatunda	Communist Party of India (Marxist)
1996	Abul Basar Laskar	Indian National Congress
2001	Noorar Rahaman	Communist Party of India (Marxist)
2006	Abul Hasnat	Communist Party of India (Marxist)
2011	Giasuddin Molla	Trinamool Congress
2016	Giasuddin Molla	Trinamool Congress
2021	Giasuddin Molla	Trinamool Congress
2026	Md. Samim Ahamed Molla	Trinamool Congress

== Election results ==
=== 2026 ===
2026 West Bengal Legislative Assembly election: Magrahat Paschim
Party	Candidate	Votes	%	±%
AITC	Md. Samim Ahamed Molla	113,834	55.43	▲5.5
BJP	Gour Sundar Ghosh	55,331	26.94	▲1.17
ISF	Abdul Aziz Al Hassan	28,714	13.98	▼6.96
NOTA	None of the above	1,130	0.55	▼0.63
Majority		58,503	28.49	▲4.33
Turnout		205,362	94.59	▲9.91
AITC hold		Swing		

=== 2021 ===
2021 West Bengal Legislative Assembly election: Magrahat Paschim
Party	Candidate	Votes	%	±%
AITC	Giasuddin Molla	97,006	49.93	▼0.78
BJP	Manas Dhurjati Saha (Note: Allegedly attacked by the supporters of AITC candidate Giasuddin Molla on 2 May 2021. Manas Saha died in a hospital in September 2021 as a result of the head injuries sustained during the attack.)	50,065	25.77	▲21.75
ISF	Maidul Islam Molla	40,685	20.94	
NOTA	None of the above	2,286	1.18	
Majority		46,941	24.16	
Turnout		194,282	84.68	
AITC hold		Swing		

=== 2016 ===
2016 West Bengal Legislative Assembly election: Magrahat Paschim
Party	Candidate	Votes	%	±%
AITC	Giasuddin Molla	87,482	50.71	▲3.60
INC	Khalid Ebadullah	71,593	41.50	New entry
BJP	Subhash Mondal	6,928	4.02	▲0.42
NOTA	None of the Above	1,870	1.08	New entry
PDS	Anuradha Putatunda	528	0.31	▼0.71
Independent	Jakir Hossain Sheikh	168	0.10	▼0.35
Majority		15,889	9.21	▲0.78
Turnout		1,72,520	85.73	▲1.82
AITC hold		Swing		

=== 2011 ===
2011 West Bengal Legislative Assembly election: Magrahat Paschim
Party	Candidate	Votes	%	±%
AITC	Giasuddin Molla	66,878	47.11	
CPI(M)	Abul Hasnat	54,908	38.68	
Independent	Saibal Mondal	10,990	7.74	
BJP	Subhash Mondal	5,112	3.60	
PDS	Anuradha Putatunda	1,444	1.02	
BSP	Amarendra Nath Mondal	1,318	0.93	
Independent	Sarabindu Halder	656	0.46	
Independent	Jakir Hossain Sheikh	644	0.45	
Majority		11,970	8.43	
Turnout		1,41,950	83.91	
AITC gain from CPI(M)		Swing		

=== 2006 ===
In 2006, Abul Hasnat of CPI(M) won the Magrahat Paschim Assembly constituency defeating his nearest rival Giasuddin Molla of AITC. Noorar Rahaman of CPI(M) defeated Giasuddin Molla of AITC in 2001. Abul Basar Laskar of INC defeated Anuradha Putatunda of CPI(M) in 1996. Anuradha Putatunda of CPI(M) defeated Abdul Basar Laskar of INC in 1991. Abdus Sobhan Gazi of CPI(M) defeated Kironmoy Deb of INC in 1987, and Sudhendu Mundle of INC in 1982 and 1977.

=== 1972 ===
Sudhendu Mundle of INC won in 1972 and 1971. Sachindranath Mondal of Bangla Congress won in 1969. Jainul Abedin of Bangla Congress won in 1967. Abdul Hashem of INC won in 1962. In 1957 and 1952, Magrahat Assembly constituency had joint seats. In 1957, Abdul Hashem and Ardhendu Sekhar Naskar, both of INC, won. In 1952, Abdul Hashem and Ardhendu Sekhar Naskar, both of INC, won.
