= Dulal Chandra Das =

Indian politician from West Bengal

Member of West Bengal Legislative Assembly
- In office 2018 – 7 May 2026
- Preceded by: Kasturi Das
- Succeeded by: Subhasish Das
- Constituency: Maheshtala

Chairman of Maheshtala Municipality
- Incumbent
- Assumed office 2015
- Preceded by: Kali Bhandari

Personal details
- Born: 1945 (age 80–81)
- Party: Trinamool Congress
- Spouse: Kasturi Das
- Relatives: Ratna Chatterjee (Daughter)
- Education: 8th Standard
- Profession: Politician

Dulal Chandra Das (Bengali : দুলাল চন্দ্র দাস) is an Indian politician, who is presently serving as the chairman of Maheshtala Municipality and second time member of West Bengal Legislative Assembly from Maheshtala (Vidhan Sabha constituency).
