= Thakurpukur Maheshtala =

Community Development Block in West Bengal, India

- Community Development Block
- Location of Thakurpukur Maheshtala community development block in South 24 Parganas district
- Coordinates: 22.5086210°N 88.2532182°E
- Country: India
- State: West Bengal
- Division: Presidency
- District: South 24 Parganas
- Subdivision: Alipore Sadar
- Headquarters: Barisha

Government
  - Gram Panchayats: Asuti-I, Asuti-II, Chatta, Rasapunja
  - Lok Sabha constituencies: Diamond Harbour
  - Vidhan Sabha constituencies: Bishnupur

Area
  - Total: 63.08 km^{2} (24.36 sq mi)

Population (2011)
  - Total: 176,203
  - Density: 2,793/km^{2} (7,235/sq mi)
  - Urban: 86,023

Demographics
  - Literacy: 83.54 per cent
  - Sex ratio: 976 ♂/♀

Languages
  - Official: Bengali
  - Additional official: English
- Time zone: UTC+05:30 (IST)
- Website: s24pgs.gov.in

Thakurpukur Maheshtala is a community development block that forms an administrative division in Alipore Sadar subdivision of South 24 Parganas district in the Indian state of West Bengal.

== Geography ==

Thakurpukur Maheshtala CD block is located at 22°30′31″N 88°15′12″E. It has an average elevation of 9 metres (30 ft).

The Thakurpukur Maheshtala CD block is bounded by the Kolkata district in the north and east, the Bishnupur I and Bishnupur II CD blocks in the south and the Budge Budge I CD block in the west.

The South 24 Parganas district is divided into two distinct physiographic zones: the marine-riverine delta in the north and the marine delta zone in the south. As the sea receded southwards, in the sub-recent geological period, a large low-lying plain got exposed. Both tidal inflows and the rivers have been depositing sediments in this plain. The periodical collapse of both the natural levees and man-made embankments speed up the process of filling up of the depressions containing brackish water wetlands. The marine delta in the south is formed of interlacing tidal channels. As non-saline water for irrigation is scarce, agriculture is monsoon dominated. Some parts of the wetlands are still preserved for raising fish.

The Thakurpukur Maheshtala CD block has an area of 63.08 km^{2}. It has 1 panchayat samity, 4 gram panchayats, 80 gram sansads (village councils), 39 mouzas and 33 inhabited villages, as per the District Statistical Handbook, South Twenty-four Parganas. Maheshtala, Rabindranagar and Kalitala Ashuti police stations serve this CD Block. Headquarters of this CD block is at Barisha.

Gram panchayats of Thakurpukur Maheshtala CD block/panchayat samiti are: Asuti-I, Asuti-II, Chatta and Rasapunja.

== Demographics ==
=== Population ===
According to the 2011 Census of India, Thakurpukur Maheshtala CD block had a total population of 176,203, of which 90,180 were rural and 86,023 were urban. There were 89,152 (51%) males and 87,051 (49%) females. There were 18,079 persons in the age range of 0 to 6 years. The Scheduled Castes numbered 60,372 (34.26%) and the Scheduled Tribes numbered 505 (0.29%).

According to the 2001 Census of India, Thakurpukur Maheshtala CD block had a total population of 136,866, out of which 70,420 were males and 66,446 were females. The Thakurpukur Maheshtala CD block registered a population growth of 35.09 per cent during the 1991-2001 decade. Decadal growth for the South 24 Parganas district was 20.89 per cent. Decadal growth in West Bengal was 17.84 per cent.

Census Towns in the Thakurpukur Maheshtala CD block (2011 census figures in brackets): Joka (9,302), Chata Kalikapur (24,985), Ganye Gangadharpur (5,210), Rameswarpur (7,200), Asuti (6,272), Hanspukuria (3,887), Kalua (15,735), Ramchandrapur (5,272) and Samali (7,180).

Large villages (with 4,000+ population) in the hakurpukur Maheshtala CD block (2011 census figures in brackets): Khanberia (4,682), Rasapunja (8,036), Banagram (4,098), Chak Rajumolla (5,308), Sarsuna (5,563), Purba Barisha (5,965) and Chak Thakurani (5,891).

=== Literacy ===
According to the 2011 census, the total number of literates in the Thakurpukur Maheshtala CD block was 132,097 (83.54% of the population over 6 years) out of which males numbered 70,300 (87.95% of the male population over 6 years) and females numbered 61,797 (79.03% of the female population over 6 years). The gender disparity (the difference between female and male literacy rates) was 8.92%.

According to the 2011 Census of India, literacy in the South 24 Parganas district was 77.51 Literacy in West Bengal was 77.08% in 2011. Literacy in India in 2011 was 74.04%.

According to the 2001 Census of India, the Thakurpukur Maheshtala CD Block had a total literacy of 74.80 per cent. While male literacy was 82.00 per cent female literacy was 67.10 per cent. South 24 Parganas district had a total literacy of 69.40 per cent, male literacy being 79.20 per cent and female literacy being 59.00 per cent.

See also – List of West Bengal districts ranked by literacy rate

Literacy in CD blocks of
South 24 Parganas district
Alipore Sadar subdivision
Bishnupur I – 78.33%
Bishnupur II – 81.37%
Budge Budge I – 80.57%
Budge Budge II – 79.13%
Thakurpukur Maheshtala – 83.54%
Baruipur subdivision
Baruipur – 76.46%
Bhangar I – 72.06%
Bhangar II – 74.49%
Jaynagar I – 73.17%
Jaynagar II – 69.71%
Kultali – 69.37%
Sonarpur – 79.70%
Canning subdivision
Basanti – 68.32%
Canning I – 70.76%
Canning II – 66.51%
Gosaba – 78.98%
Diamond Harbour subdivision
Diamond Harbour I – 75.72%
Diamond Harbour II – 76.91%
Falta – 77.17%
Kulpi – 75.49%
Magrahat I – 73.82%
Magrahat II – 77.41%
Mandirbazar – 75.89%
Mathurapur I – 73.93%
Mathurapur II – 77.77%
Kakdwip subdivision
Kakdwip – 77.93%
Namkhana – 85.72
Patharpratima – 82.11%
Sagar – 84.21%
Source: 2011 Census: CD Block Wise
Primary Census Abstract Data

=== Language ===
Languages of Thakurpukur Maheshtala CD block (2011)
1. Bengali (95.0%)
2. Hindi (3.97%)
3. Urdu (1.06%)
4. Others (0.01%)

At the time of the 2011 census, 94.96% of the population spoke Bengali, 3.97% Hindi and 1.06% Urdu as their first language.

=== Religion ===
Religion in Thakurpukur Maheshtala CD block (2011)
Hinduism	67.32%
Islam	26.64%
Christianity	5.65%
Other or not stated	0.39%

In the 2011 Census of India, Hindus numbered 118,615 and formed 67.32% of the population in Thakurpukur Maheshtala CD block. Muslims numbered 46,945 and formed 26.64% of the population. Others numbered 10,643 and formed 6.04% of the population. Amongst the others, Christians numbered 9,954. In 2001, Hindus were 66.09% of the population, while Muslims and Christians were 28.46% and 5.25% of the population respectively.

The proportion of Hindus in South Twenty-four Parganas district has declined from 76.0% in 1961 to 63.2% in 2011. The proportion of Muslims in South Twenty-four Parganas district has increased from 23.4% to 35.6% during the same period. Christians formed 0.8% in 2011.

== Rural poverty ==
As per the Human Development Report for the South 24 Parganas district, published in 2009, in the Thakurpukur Maheshtala CD block the percentage of households below poverty line was 6.44%, the lowest amongst all the CD blocks in the district. As per rural household survey in 2005, the proportion of households in the South 24 Parganas with poverty rates below poverty line was 34.11%, way above the state and national poverty ratios. The poverty rates were very high in the Sundarbans settlements with all the thirteen CD blocks registering poverty ratios above 30% and eight CD blocks had more than 40% of the population in the BPL category.

== Economy ==
=== Livelihood ===
Livelihood
in Thakurpukur Maheshtala CD block
1. Cultivators (3.41%)
2. Agricultural labourers (4.26%)
3. Household industries (6.00%)
4. Other Workers (86.3%)

In the Thakurpukur Maheshtala CD block in 2011, among the class of total workers, cultivators numbered 2,320 and formed 3.41%, agricultural labourers numbered 2,894 and formed 4.26%, household industry workers numbered 4,080 and formed 6.00% and other workers numbered 58,687 and formed 86.33%. Total workers numbered 67,981 and formed 38.58% of the total population, and non-workers numbered 108,222 and formed 61.42% of the population.

The District Human Development Report points out that in the blocks of region situated in the close proximity of the Kolkata metropolis, overwhelming majority are involved in the non-agricultural sector for their livelihood. On the other hand, in the Sundarbans settlements, overwhelming majority are dependent on agriculture. In the intermediate region, there is again predominance of the non-agricultural sector. Though the region is not very close to Kolkata, many places are well connected and some industrial/ economic development has taken place.

Note: In the census records a person is considered a cultivator, if the person is engaged in cultivation/ supervision of land owned by self/government/institution. When a person who works on another person's land for wages in cash or kind or share, is regarded as an agricultural labourer. Household industry is defined as an industry conducted by one or more members of the family within the household or village, and one that does not qualify for registration as a factory under the Factories Act. Other workers are persons engaged in some economic activity other than cultivators, agricultural labourers and household workers. It includes factory, mining, plantation, transport and office workers, those engaged in business and commerce, teachers, entertainment artistes and so on.

=== Infrastructure ===
There are 33 inhabited villages in the Thakurpukur Maheshtala CD block, as per the District Census Handbook, South Twenty-four Parganas, 2011. 100% villages have power supply. 32 villages (96.97%) have drinking water supply. 4 villages (12.12%) have post offices. 33 villages (100%) have telephones (including landlines, public call offices and mobile phones). 20 villages (60.61%) have pucca (paved) approach roads and 12 villages (36.36%) have transport communication (includes bus service, rail facility and navigable waterways). 1 village (3.03%) has an agricultural credit society and 5 villages (15.15%) have banks.

=== Agriculture ===
The South 24 Parganas had played a significant role in the Tebhaga movement launched by the Communist Party of India in 1946. Subsequently, Operation Barga was aimed at securing tenancy rights for the peasants. In the Thakurpukur Maheshtala CD block 98.96 acres of land was acquired and vested. Out of this 19.20 acres or 19.40% of the vested land was distributed. The total number of patta (document) holders was 47.

According to the District Human Development Report, agriculture is an important source of livelihood in the South Twentyfour Parganas district. The amount of cultivable land per agricultural worker is only 0.41 hectare in the district. Moreover, the irrigation facilities have not been extended to a satisfactory scale. Agriculture mostly remains a mono-cropped activity.

As per the District Census Handbook, the saline soil of the district is unfit for cultivation, but the non-salty lands are very fertile. While rice is the main food crop, jute is the main cash crop.

In 2013–14, there were 8 fertiliser depots, 7 seed stores and 24 fair price shops in Thakurpukur Maheshtala CD block|

In 2013–14, Thakurpukur Maheshtala CD block produced 1,018 tonnes of Aman paddy, the main winter crop from 624 hectares, 1,179 tonnes of Boro paddy (spring crop) from 376 hectares.

=== Pisciculture ===
In the Thakurpukur Maheshtala CD block, in 2013–14, net area under effective pisciculture was 185 hectares, engaging 1,550 persons in the profession, and with an approximate annual production of 16,080 quintals.

Pisciculture is an important source of employment in the South 24 Parganas district. As of 2001, more than 4.5 lakh people were engaged in pisciculture. Out of this 2.57 lakhs were from the 13 blocks in the Sundarbans settlements.

=== Banking ===
In 2013–14, the Thakurpukur Maheshtala CD block had offices of 23 commercial banks and 8 gramin banks.

=== Backward Regions Grant Fund ===
The South 24 Parganas district is listed as a backward region and receives financial support from the Backward Regions Grant Fund. The fund, created by the Government of India, is designed to redress regional imbalances in development. As of 2012, 272 districts across the country were listed under this scheme. The list includes 11 districts of West Bengal.

== Transport ==
Thakurpukur Maheshtala CD block has 13 originating/ terminating bus routes.

Santoshpur, Akra, Nangi and Budge Budge are stations on the Sealdah South section.

== Education ==
In 2013–14, the Thakurpukur Maheshtala CD block had 56 primary schools with 6,668 students, 1 middle school with 109 students, 7 high schools with 2,152 students and 11 higher secondary schools with 8,853 students. Thakupukur Maheshtala CD block had 1 technical/ professional institution with 948 students and 209 institutions for special and non-formal education with 10,292 students. Maheshtala municipal area (outside the CD block) had 2 general degree colleges with 1,855 students.

See also – Education in India

According to the 2011 census, in Thakurpukur Maheshtala CD block, among the 33 inhabited villages, 2 villages did not have a school, 13 villages had two or more primary schools, 11 villages had at least 1 primary and 1 middle school and 10 villages had at least 1 middle and 1 secondary school.

== Healthcare ==
In 2014, the Thakurpukur Maheshtala CD block had 1 block primary health centre and 7 private nursing homes with total 219 beds and 32 doctors (excluding private bodies). It had 19 family welfare subcentres. 154 patients were treated indoor and 29,942 patients were treated outdoor in the hospitals, health centres and subcentres of the CD block.

According to the 2011 census, in Thakurpukur Maheshtala CD block, 1 village had a community health centre, 2 villages had primary health centres, 10 villages had primary health subcentres, 2 villages had maternity and child welfare centres, 12 villages had medicine shops and out of the 33 inhabited villages 9 villages had no medical facilities.

Sarsuna Block Primary Health Centre at Sarsuna, with 15 beds is the major government medical facility for Thakurpukur Maheshtala CD block.
