= Nungi =

- Neighbourhood in Maheshtala
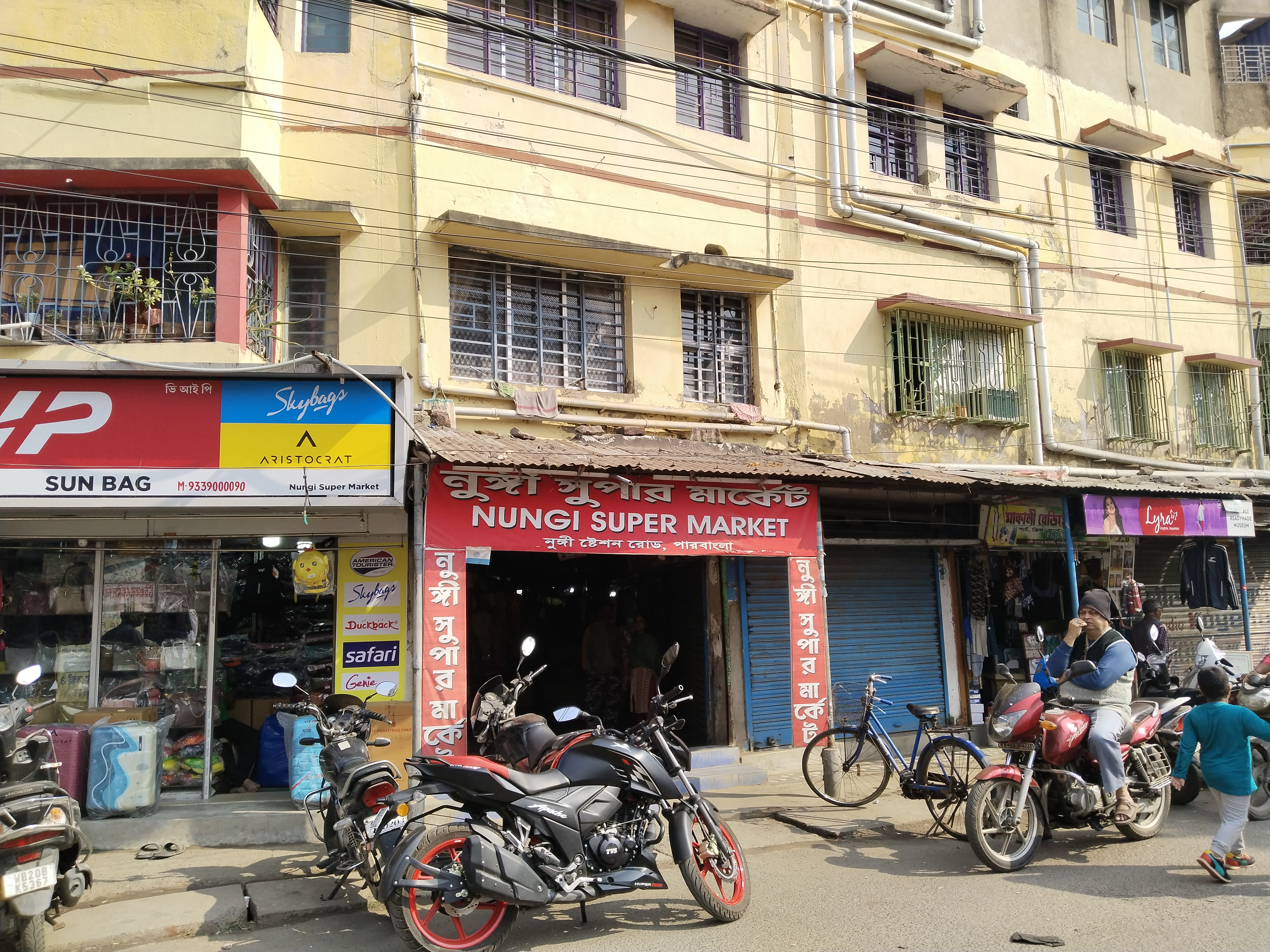
- Nungi Supermarket

- Location in West Bengal Location in India
- Coordinates: 22.4973°N 88.2214°E
- Country: India
- State: West Bengal
- Division: Presidency
- District: South 24 Parganas
- Region: Greater Kolkata

Government
  - Type: Municipality
  - Body: Maheshtala Municipality
- Elevation: 9 m (30 ft)

Languages
  - Official: Bengali
  - Additional official: English
- Time zone: UTC+5:30 (IST)
- PIN: 700140
- Telephone code: +91 33
- Vehicle registration: WB-19 to WB-22, WB-95 to WB-99
- Lok Sabha constituency: Diamond Harbour
- Vidhan Sabha constituency: Maheshtala
- Website: www.maheshtalamunicipality.org

Nungi is a neighbourhood in Maheshtala of the South 24 Parganas district in the Indian state of West Bengal. It is a part of the area covered by Kolkata Metropolitan Development Authority (KMDA).

== Geography ==
Cities and towns in the western part of Alipore Sadar subdivision (including Budge Budge I & II, Thakurpukur Maheshtala CD blocks) in South 24 Parganas district
M: municipal city/ town, CT: census town, R: rural/ urban centre,
Owing to space constraints in the small map, the actual locations in a larger map may vary slightly
Bakrahat is in Bishnupur II CD block, but Lakshmibala Rural Hospital at Bakrahat serves Budge Budge II CD block and so it is included here.

=== Area overview ===
Alipore Sadar subdivision is the most urbanized part of the South 24 Parganas district. 59.85% of the population lives in the urban areas and 40.15% lives in the rural areas. In the northern portion of the subdivision (shown in the map alongside) there are 21 census towns. The entire district is situated in the Ganges Delta and the subdivision, on the east bank of the Hooghly River, is an alluvial stretch, with industrial development.

Note: The map alongside presents some of the notable locations in the subdivision. All places marked in the map are linked in the larger full screen map.

=== Location ===
Nungi is located at 22°29′50″N 88°13′17″E. It has an average elevation of 9 metres (30 ft).

== Economy ==
Located near the industrial locality of the Batanagar, shoe making is a common cottage industry in Nungi, with families manufacturing shoes for brands that have out-sourced labour, including Khadim's, Sreeleathers, and Liberty. Nungi once had a thriving fireworks industry and the "Chocolate Bomb" from Nungi market remains well known during the Diwali festival. In 2007 a joint development project was announced involving the London-based company REIT Asset Management, Eden Realty Ventures Private Limited, a Bengali NRI and the Mahestala Municipality. The project, known as the Maheshtala project, involved the development of a mini township near Nangi railway station.

== Transport ==
Nungi is on the Budge Budge Trunk Road.

Nangi railway station is on the Sealdah–Budge Budge line of the Kolkata Suburban Railway system.

=== Commuters ===
With the electrification of the railways, suburban traffic has grown tremendously since the 1960s. As of 2005-06, more than 1.7 million (17 lakhs) commuters use the Kolkata Suburban Railway system daily. After the partition of India, refugees from East Pakistan/ Bangladesh had a strong impact on the development of urban areas in the periphery of Kolkata. The new immigrants depended on Kolkata for their livelihood, thus increasing the number of commuters. Eastern Railway runs 1,272 EMU trains daily.

== Education ==
Nangi High School is a Bengali-medium school for boys. It was established in 1947 and has facilities for teaching from class V to class XII.

Nangi Balika Bidyalay Up High School is a Bengali-medium school for girls. It was established in 1948 and has facilities for teaching from class V to class XII.
