= Pattanaik =

Pattanaik is a surname. Notable people with the surname include:

- Bijayananda Pattanaik (1916–1997), Indian politician, aviator and businessman
- Devdutt Pattanaik, Indian mythologist, speaker, illustrator and author
- Gopal Ballav Pattanaik (born 1937), Indian lawyer, Judge of the Supreme Court of India and 32nd Chief Justice of India
- Hara Pattanaik (1958–2015), Indian actor, director and screenplay writer
- Janaki Ballabh Pattanaik (1927–2015), Indian politician, Governor of Assam from 2009 to 2014
- Kasturi Pattanaik, Odissi dance exponent, performer, choreographer, teacher, trainer and music composer from India
- Navin Pattanaik (born 1946), Indian politician, 14th Chief Minister of Odisha
- Prasanta Pattanaik (born 1943), emeritus professor at the Department of Economics at the University of California
- Rama Kant Pattanaik, PVSM, AVSM, YSM, Deputy Chief of the Naval Staff (DCNS) of Indian Navy and of Integrated Defence Staff (DCIDS)

== See also ==
- Devlok with Devdutt Pattanaik, Indian Hindi television series which aired on the EPIC Channel
- Patanak
- Patnaik
- Piatnik
