= Santoshpur, Garden Reach =

Santoshpur
- Neighbourhood
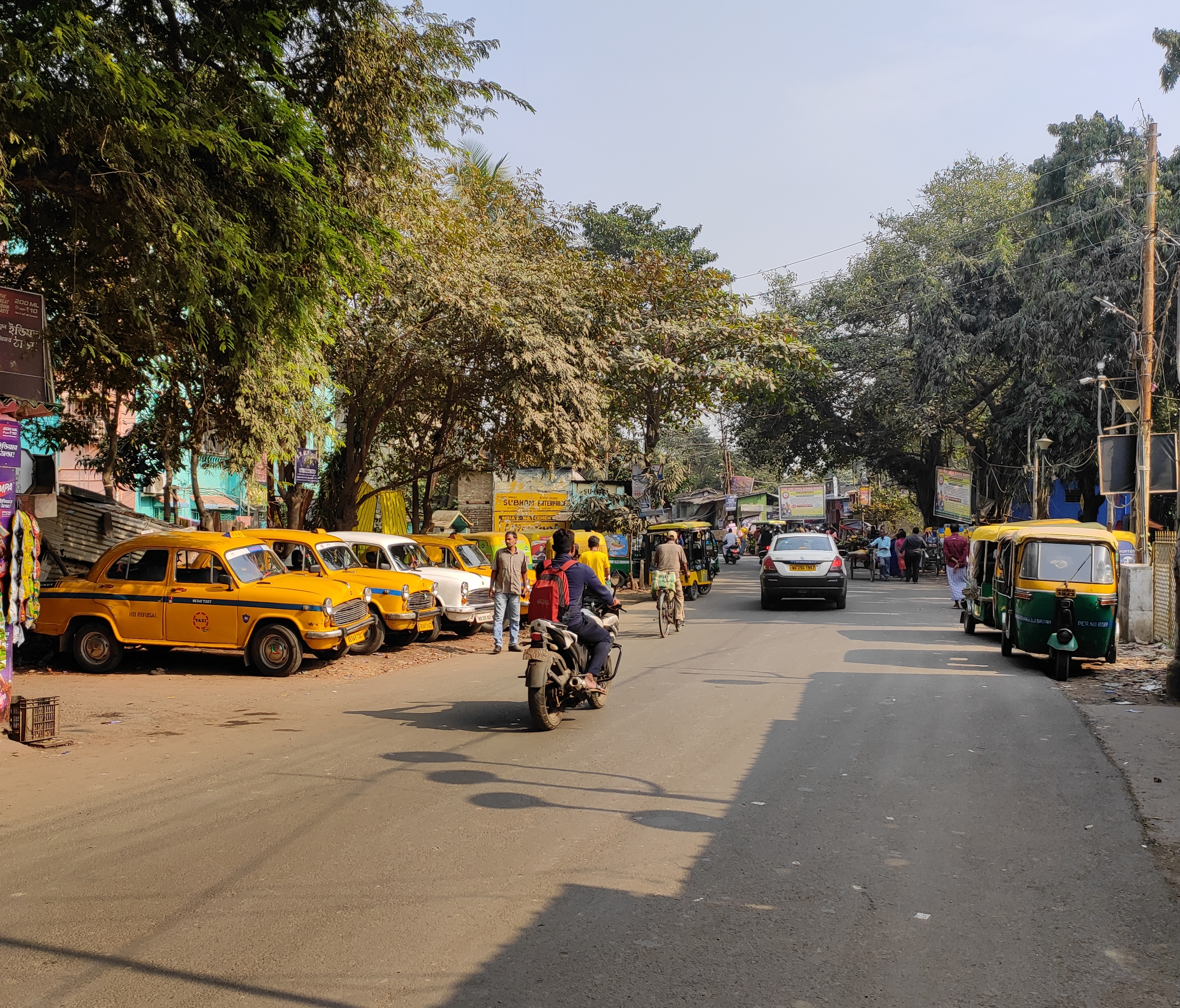
- Santoshpur Rd, Bidhangarh

- Location in Kolkata Santoshpur (West Bengal) Santoshpur (India)
- Coordinates: 22.5342°N 88.2707°E
- Country: India
- State: West Bengal
- Division: Presidency
- District: South 24 Parganas
- Region: Greater Kolkata
- Kolkata Suburban Railway: Santoshpur railway station
- Wards: 1, 2, 3, 4, 5, 6, 7, 9 and 10

Government
  - Type: Municipality
  - Body: Maheshtala Municipality
- Elevation: 9 m (30 ft)

Languages
  - Official: Bengali
  - Additional official: English
- Time zone: UTC+5:30 (IST)
- PIN: 700018, 700024, 700066
- Telephone code: +91 33
- Lok Sabha constituency: Diamond Harbour
- Vidhan Sabha constituency: Metiaburuz

Santoshpur is a neighbourhood of South 24 Parganas district in the Indian state of West Bengal. It is a part of greater Garden Reach region. It is also a part of the area covered by Kolkata Metropolitan Development Authority (KMDA).

== Geography ==
=== Location ===
Santoshpur, located in the south-western fringes of Kolkata, is bounded by Metiabruz in the north, Garden Reach in the north east, Maheshtala in the south and Hooghly River in the west.

Santoshpur is a part of the greater Garden Reach region which is composed of Panchur Mauza and Makalhati Mauza. The two mauzas are under Metiaburuz Assembly constituency of South 24 Parganas district. Localities within Santoshpur include Rabindra Nagar, Dutta Bagan, Panchur, Bidhangarh, Santoshpur Co-operative Society, Dakshinee Housing Estate, Kankhuly Peerdanga, Ghoshpara, Gulzar Bagh, Halder Para, Padirhati, Ramdashati, Shantinagar, Kalinagar, Paharpur.

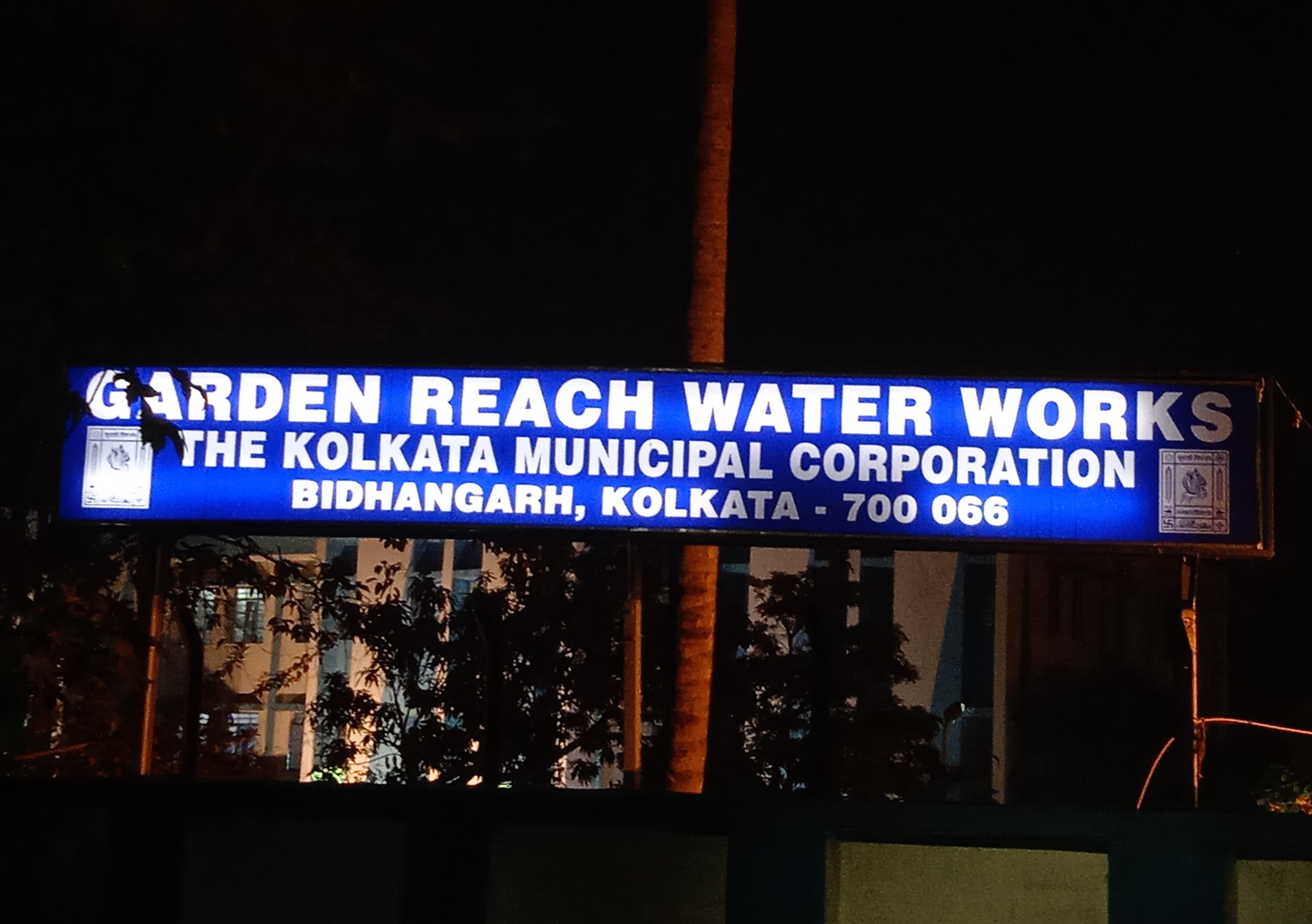
Garden Reach Water Works

- Garden Reach Water Works is a water treatment plant having a capacity of 210 MGD under the Kolkata Municipal Corporation which supplies filtered water to entire South Kolkata. It is located at Santoshpur, Bidhangarh.

=== Police station ===
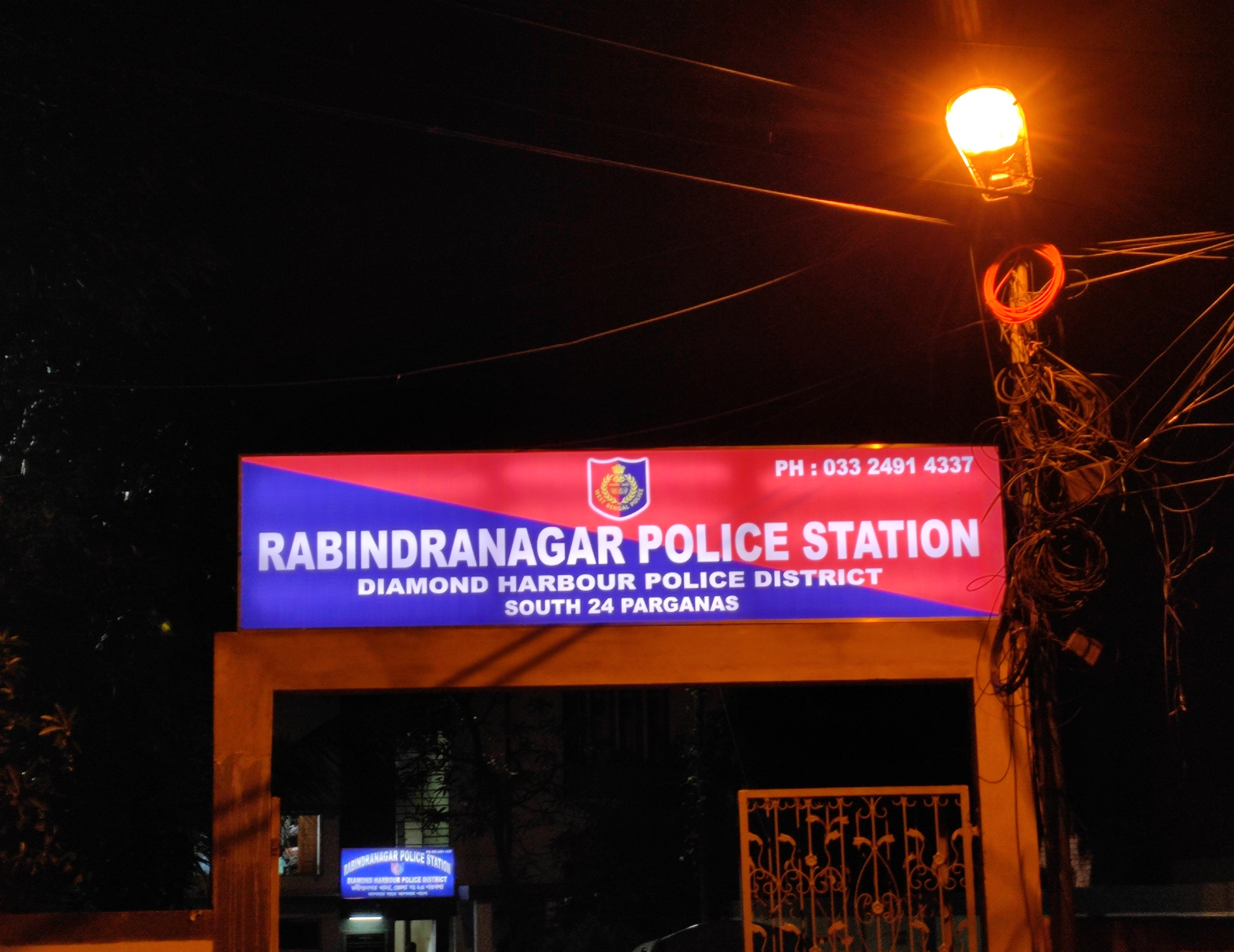
Rabindranagar Police station

The area is served by the Rabindranagar Police station covering an area of 6 km^{2} (2.3 sq mi).

=== Post office ===
Bidhangarh has a delivery sub post office, with PIN 700066 in the Kolkata South Division of Kolkata district in Calcutta region.

Garden Reach has a delivery sub post office, with PIN 700024 in the Kolkata South Division of Kolkata district in Calcutta region. Other post office with the same PIN is T.G Road.

Bartala has a delivery sub post office, with PIN 700018 in the Kolkata South Division of Kolkata district in Calcutta region. Other post office with the same PIN is Rabindra Nagar.

== Economy ==
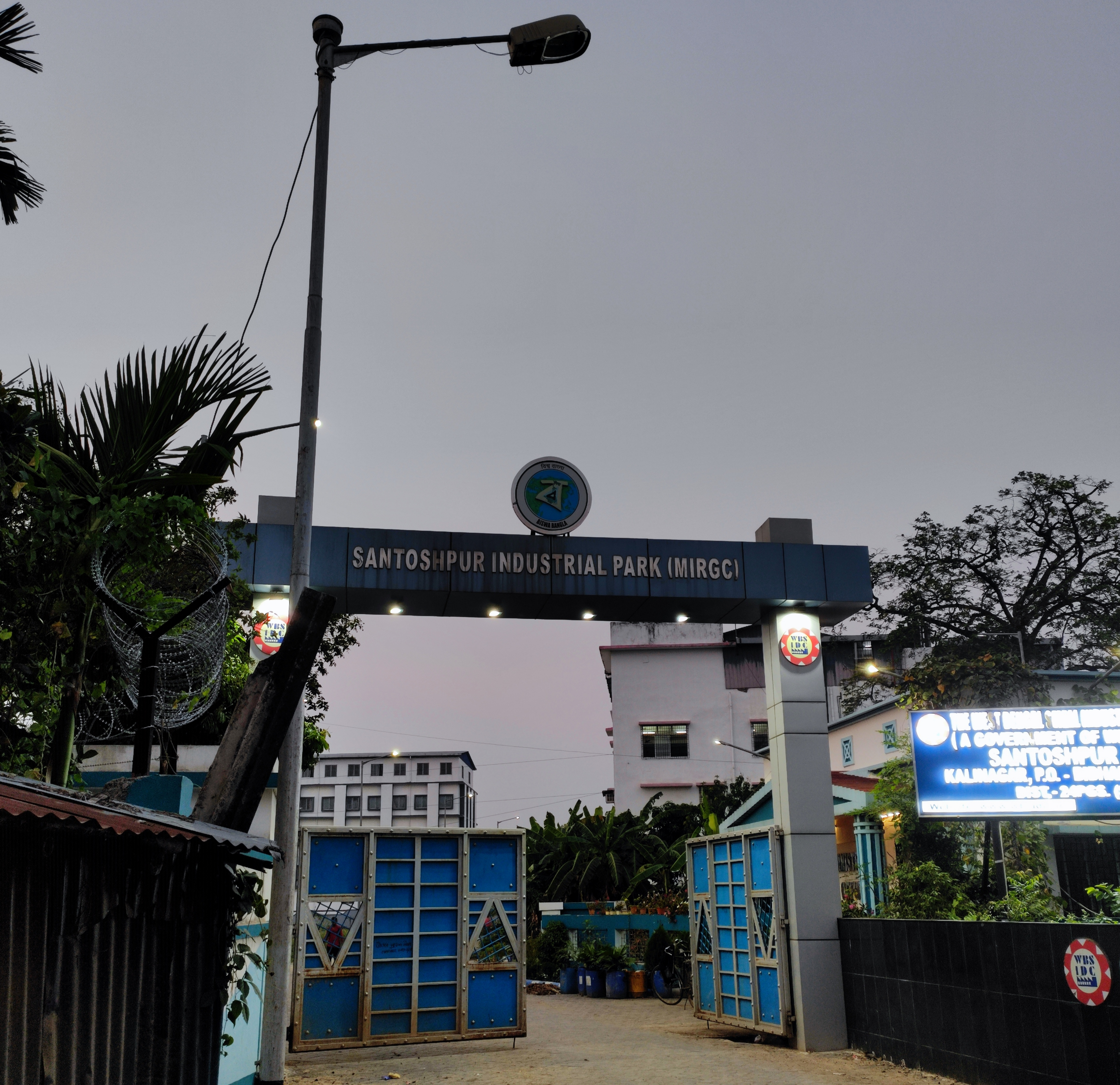
Santoshpur Industrial Estate

- Santoshpur Industrial Estate is a modern integrated readymade garment complex located at CMD Rd, Kalinagar, Bidhangarh.
- Readymade Garments manufacturing at Metiabruz - Santoshpur area.

== Education ==
The following institutions are located in the Santoshpur - Garden Reach area:

- Panchur College was established in the year 2008 for providing higher education to the minority inhabitants of Metiabruz - Santoshpur. It is situated at Santoshpur, Bidhangarh near Santoshpur-Bartala Link Rd.
- Al-Ameen Mission, Panchur, established in 2007, is a premier educational institute to empower poor and backward minority section through education. It is situated at Santoshpur, Bidhangarh near Santoshpur-Bartala Link Rd.
- Panchur High School, established in 1973, is a Bengali medium higher secondary school at Panchur, P.O Bidhangarh.
- Akra Shaktigarh Rabindra Vidyapith, established in 1958, is a co-educational higher secondary school at Rabindra Nagar, P.O Bartala.
- Rabindra Balika Vidyapith, established in 1961, is a reputed girls higher secondary school at Rabindra Nagar, P.O Bartala.
- Kankhuly High School, established in 1954, is a Bengali medium boys higher secondary school at Kankhuly Peerdanga, P.O Bidhangarh.
- Kankhuly Girls High School, established in 1958, is a girls higher secondary school at Kankhuly Peerdanga, P.O Bidhangarh.
- Santoshpur Shyama Prasad Vidyalaya For Girls, established in 1959, is a girls higher secondary school at Santoshpur, P.O Bidhangarh.
- Hridaynath Kayal Vidyapith, established in 1972, is a secondary school at Ramdashati, P.O Garden Reach.
- Santoshpur Kachi -O- Kancha, established in 1979, is a self-financed nursery and a primary school at Santoshpur, P.O Bidhangarh.
- Birla Bharati, established in 2001, is a co-educational higher secondary school affiliated to CBSE Board. It is located at Santoshpur New Rd, Near Nature Park, P.O Bidhangarh.
- All Saints High School, established in 1998, is a co-educational higher secondary school at Rabindra Nagar, P.O Bartala.
- Nalanda English Medium School, established in 2000, is a co-educational higher secondary school at South Bidhangarh, P.O Bidhangarh.
- St. Mathew Convent School, established in 2006, is a co-educational secondary school at Santoshpur New Rd, P.O Bidhangarh.

== Transport ==
=== Road ===
Santoshpur Road is the main road in this area which connects Taratala Rd near Nature Park.

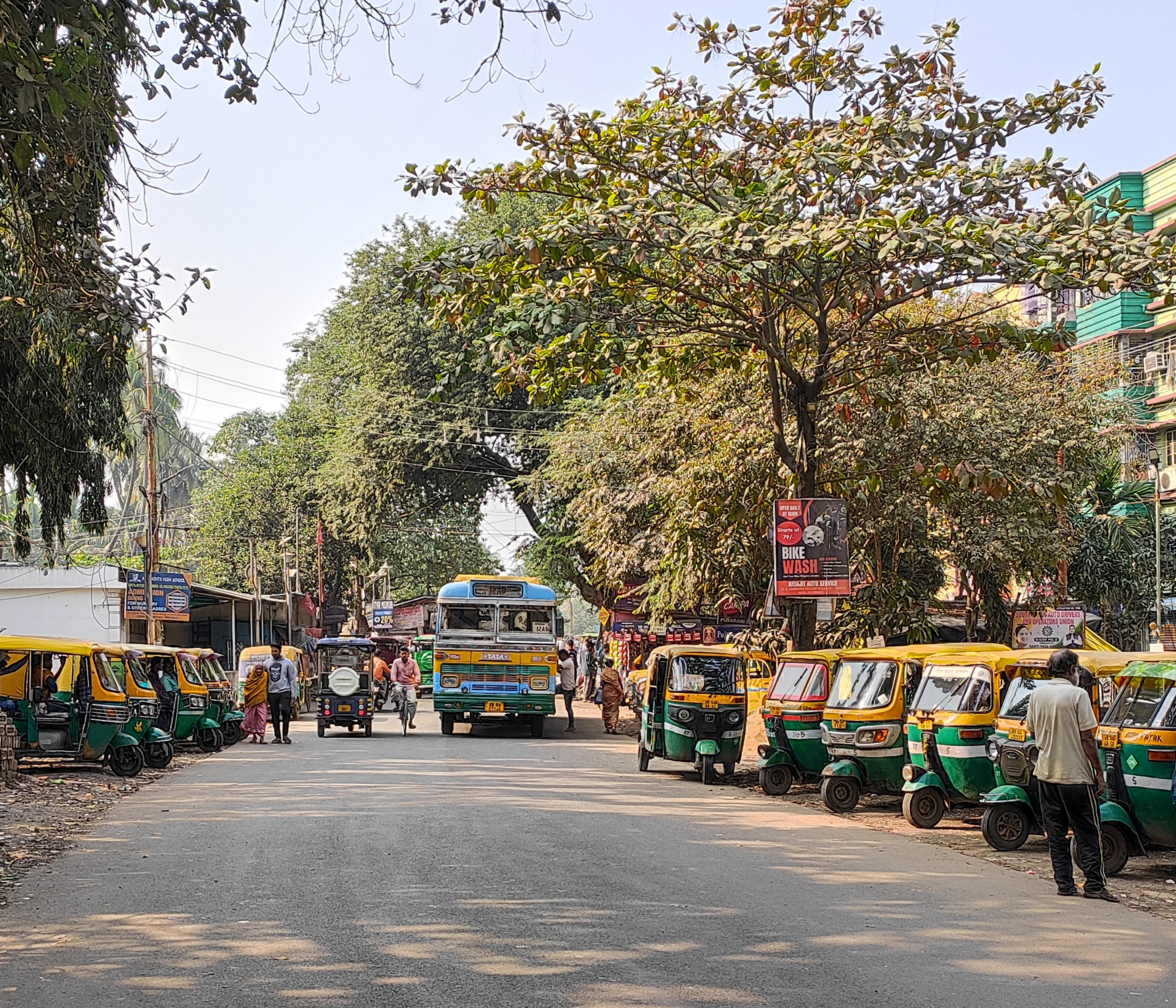

Several buses ply on Santoshpur Rd are:

- 12AD Akra Phatak - Howrah Station
- S-46 Rabindra Nagar - Karunamoyee (Salt Lake)
- SD-27 Akra Phatak - Dostipur

Auto services are available towards Taratala Xing, Bartala Rail Line More, Bandhabartala, Haziratan Hati Park, Akra Phatak, Mollargate and Dakghar (via Kankhuli Amlitala). Another new auto service has started from Nature Park to Santoshpur near Nature Park Out Post. Santoshpur Taxi stand is located at Bidhangarh near Santoshpur station.

=== Railway ===
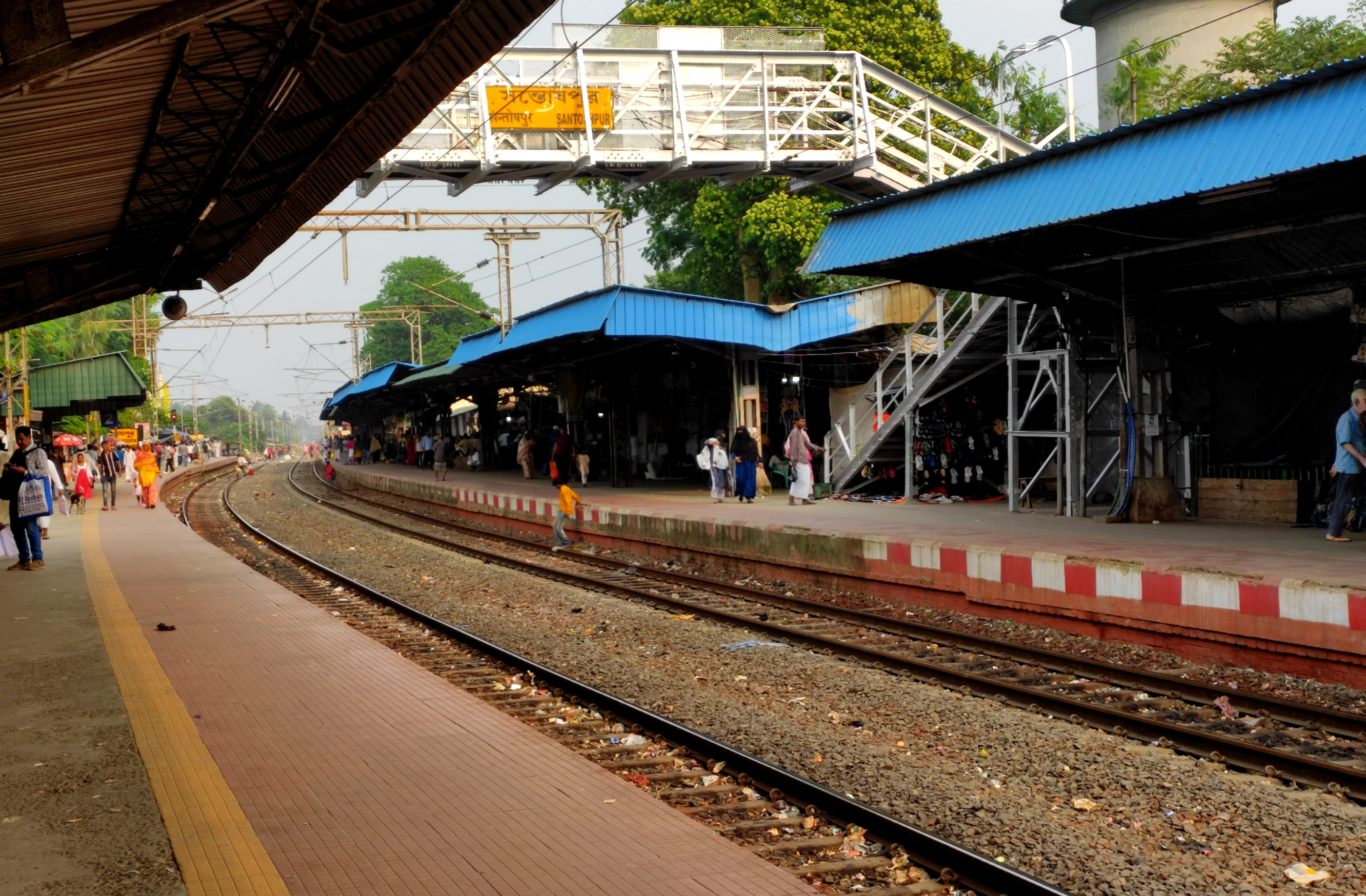
Santoshpur railway station

Santoshpur railway station on the Budge Budge Branch line is situated near Santoshpur Road, Bidhangarh.

== Markets ==
Markets in Santoshpur - Garden Reach area are:

- Santoshpur Bazar
- Ramdashati Bazar
- Akra Fatak Bazar
- Santoshpur Bazarpara Market
- Kankhuly Peerdanga Bazar
- Shantinagar Bazar

== See also ==
- Garden Reach
- Nature Park of India
