= Priyanka (1994 film) =

- Theatrical release poster
- Directed by: Neelakanda
- Written by: P. Kalaimani (dialogues)
- Screenplay by: Neelakanda
- Story by: Sutanu Gupta
- Based on: Damini by Rajkumar Santoshi
- Produced by: Neelakanda
- Starring: Prabhu; Jayaram; Revathi
- Cinematography: B. Kannan
- Edited by: B. Lenin; V. T. Vijayan
- Music by: Ilaiyaraaja
- Production company: Neelakanda Arts
- Release date: 27 May 1994
- Running time: 140 minutes
- Country: India
- Language: Tamil

Priyanka is a 1994 Indian Tamil-language legal drama film written and produced by Neelakanta in his directorial debut. A remake of the 1993 Hindi film Damini, it stars Prabhu, Jayaram and Revathi as the title character. The film was released on 27 May 1994, and Revathi won numerous awards for her performance, including the Filmfare Award for Best Actress – Tamil.

== Plot ==
Priyanka is a straightforward person and the daughter of Krishnan, a postmaster. Her father is looking for a groom for her elder sister and herself, but her sister elopes with another man. Shekar, a wealthy businessman, falls in love with Priyanka at first sight. Shekar's father, Sriram, is business partners with Gokulnath, and they decide to arrange a marriage between Shekar and Gokulnath's daughter, Kamini. However, Shekar reveals his love for Priyanka to his family, and they accept it. Shekar and Priyanka get married, but Gokulnath feels betrayed and decides to take revenge on Shekar's family. Priyanka moves into Shekar's bungalow.

One day, Priyanka and Shekar witness Shekar's younger brother Vinoth and his friends raping the young maid-servant Ganga. Ganga files a complaint against Vinoth, who is arrested by Ravi, a police officer. However, to save Vinoth, Shekar's family tries to squash the case. Priyanka decides to become the principal witness after seeing Ganga in the hospital, but Shekar's mother orders her to leave the bungalow while Shekar is abroad. Priyanka decides to live with her sister.

The matter goes to court, and Sriram hires Rudrayya, a criminal lawyer who has never lost a case. Shekar asks Priyanka to forget everything and return home, but she refuses. In the courtroom, Rudrayya, Shekar's family, and even Krishnan, Priyanka's father, portray her as a mentally unstable person. As a result, Priyanka is sent to a mental hospital by a judicial order, and Vinoth orders her to be killed. Unable to bear the mental torture in the hospital, Priyanka escapes and runs into Arjun, an alcoholic lawyer, who re-opens the case. Later, Ganga dies in the hospital with a suicide note written by Ravi, but Ganga was illiterate. The rest of the story revolves around what Priyanka undergoes to get justice.

== Cast ==
- Prabhu as Arjun
- Kasthuri as Kasthuri
- Jayaram as Sekar
- Revathi as Priyanka
- Jaishankar as Sriram
- Manjula as Susila
- Delhi Ganesh as Krishnan
- Dubbing Janaki as Chandra
- Nassar as Lawyer Rudraiya
- Nizhalgal Ravi as S. I Ravi
- Vennira Aadai Moorthy as Susila's brother
- Sachu as Susila's sister-in-law
- Charli as Sekar's friend
- Captain Raju as Gokulnath
- Rajchandar as Vinoth
- Viji Chandrasekhar as Kamini
- Sudha as Priyanka's sister
- Seetha as Ganga
- Babloo as Dancer
- Silk as Dancer

== Production ==
Priyanka, a remake of the 1993 Hindi film Damini, is the directorial debut of Neelakanta, who also produced the film.

== Soundtrack ==
The soundtrack was composed by Ilaiyaraaja. The song "Durga Durga" is set in the Carnatic raga Revati, "Indha Jilla Muzhukka Nalla Theriyum" is set to the Hindustani raga Brindavani Sarang, "Nyabagam Illaiyo" is set in the Carnatic Simhendramadhyamam, and "Vanakkuyile Kuyil" is set in the Carnatic Lalitha.

Song	Singer(s)	Lyrics	Duration
"Durga Durga"	K. S. Chithra	Vaali	2:59
"Indha Jilla Muzhukka Nalla Theriyum"	Mano, K. S. Chithra	Vaali	5:10
"Nyabagam Illaiyo" (duet)	Ilaiyaraaja, S. Janaki	Mu. Metha	5:00
"Nyabagam Illaiyo" (solo)	Ilaiyaraaja	Mu. Metha	2:43
"Vanakkuyile Kuyil"	S. P. Balasubrahmanyam	Vaali	4:56
"Vettukili Vetti Vantha"	Mano, Swarnalatha	Pulamaipithan	6:09

== Release and reception ==
Priyanka was released on 27 May 1994. Malini Mannath of The Indian Express praised Neelakanta's direction, saying that he "displays a lot of confidence in handling the script [..] and the essence of the film is not lost" and also praised the artistes for "giving very credible and satisfying performances". The Hindu wrote, "The portrayal of [Prabhu] will be the talking point for some time to come". K. Vijiyan of New Straits Times wrote, "Priyanka is saved by good performances by Revathi, [Jayaram], Prabhu and [Nassar] and the drama in the court scenes". Thulasi of Kalki praised the film's concept and performances of the star cast.

== Accolades ==
Event	Award	Recipient	Ref.
Filmfare Awards South	Best Actress – Tamil	Revathi	
Film Fans Association Awards	Best Actress – Tamil	Revathi	
Kumudam Awards	Best Actress – Tamil	Revathi	

== Bibliography ==
- Sundararaman (2007) [2005]. Raga Chintamani: A Guide to Carnatic Ragas Through Tamil Film Music (2nd ed.). Pichhamal Chintamani. OCLC 295034757.
