= Batanagar Flyover =

Bridge in Kolkata, India

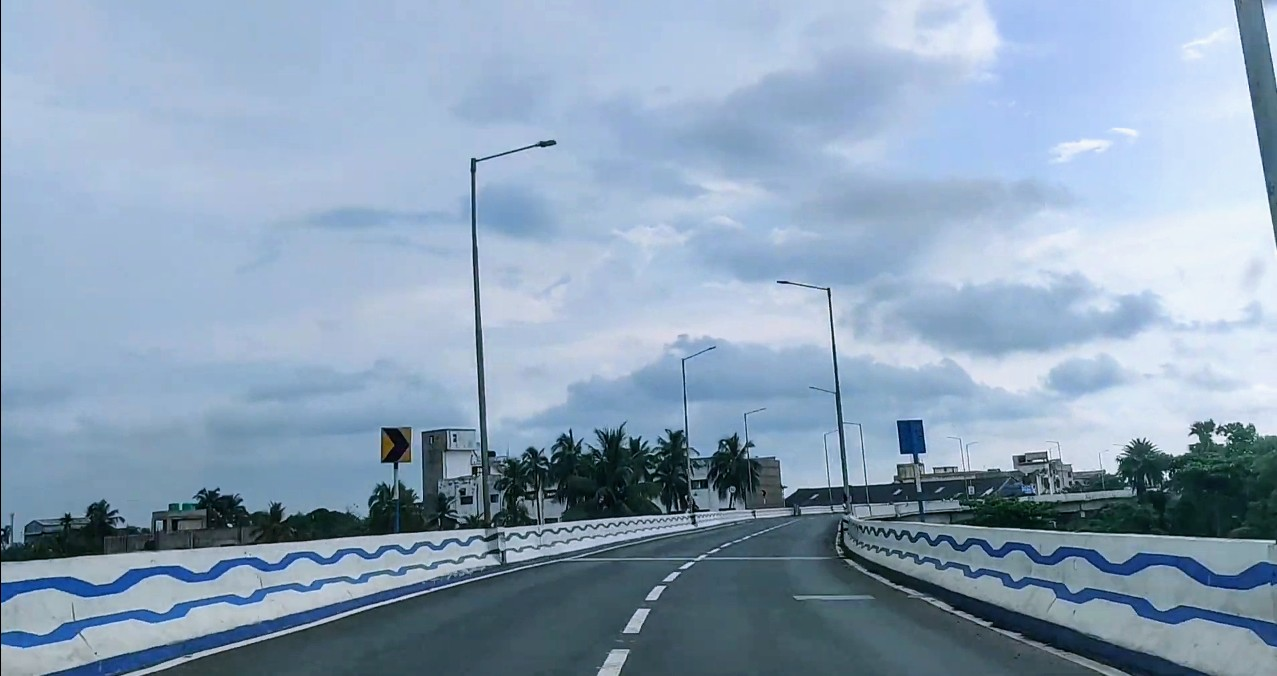
- Carries: Bikes, cars
- Locale: Maheshtala, West Bengal, India
- Official name: Sampriti Flyover
- Maintained by: Kolkata Metropolitan Development Authority (KMDA)

Characteristics
- Material: Steel, Concrete
- Total length: 7.5 kilometres (4.7 mi)
- Width: 8.5 metres (28 ft)

History
- Constructed by: L&T
- Construction start: 2014
- Construction end: October 2018
- Construction cost: 355 crores
- Opened: 11 January 2019; 6 years ago

Statistics
- Toll: Yes (Except two wheelers and four wheelers)

Batanagar Flyover (Bengali: বাটানগর উড়ালপুল; also known as Sampriti Flyover) is a flyover in the southern suburbs of Kolkata. The two-lane flyover is 7.5 km (4.7 mi) and 28 ft (8.5 m) wide. The flyover connects Batanagar with Jinjira Bazaar. The Sampriti flyover is the first in the city to be built on PPP mode. The centre has given 35 percent of the cost since this is a Jawaharlal Nehru National Urban Renewal Mission project and the rest has been borne by the consortium of RiverBank Holdings and its joint venture partner L&T Dabriwala.

== History ==
The Budge Budge Trunk Road connecting Batanagar and Budge Budge with Taratala is narrower than required, so traffic jam was a normal feature of the road. To solve this problem the conception of constructing Batanagar Flyover rose. Chief Minister Mamata Banerjee announced the construction of the Batanagar Flyover in the 2014.

After this the construction of this flyover began. After receiving the tender for the construction of the flyover, the L&T Company is engaged in the construction of the flyover. Its construction cost is estimated at 255 crore. Of which, 86.8 crore will be given by the central government and the rest by the construction company. In October 2018, the construction of the flyover was completed. However, the total cost of construction of the flyover is 355 crore.

Mamata Banerjee inaugurated the flyover on 11 January 2019.

== Importance ==
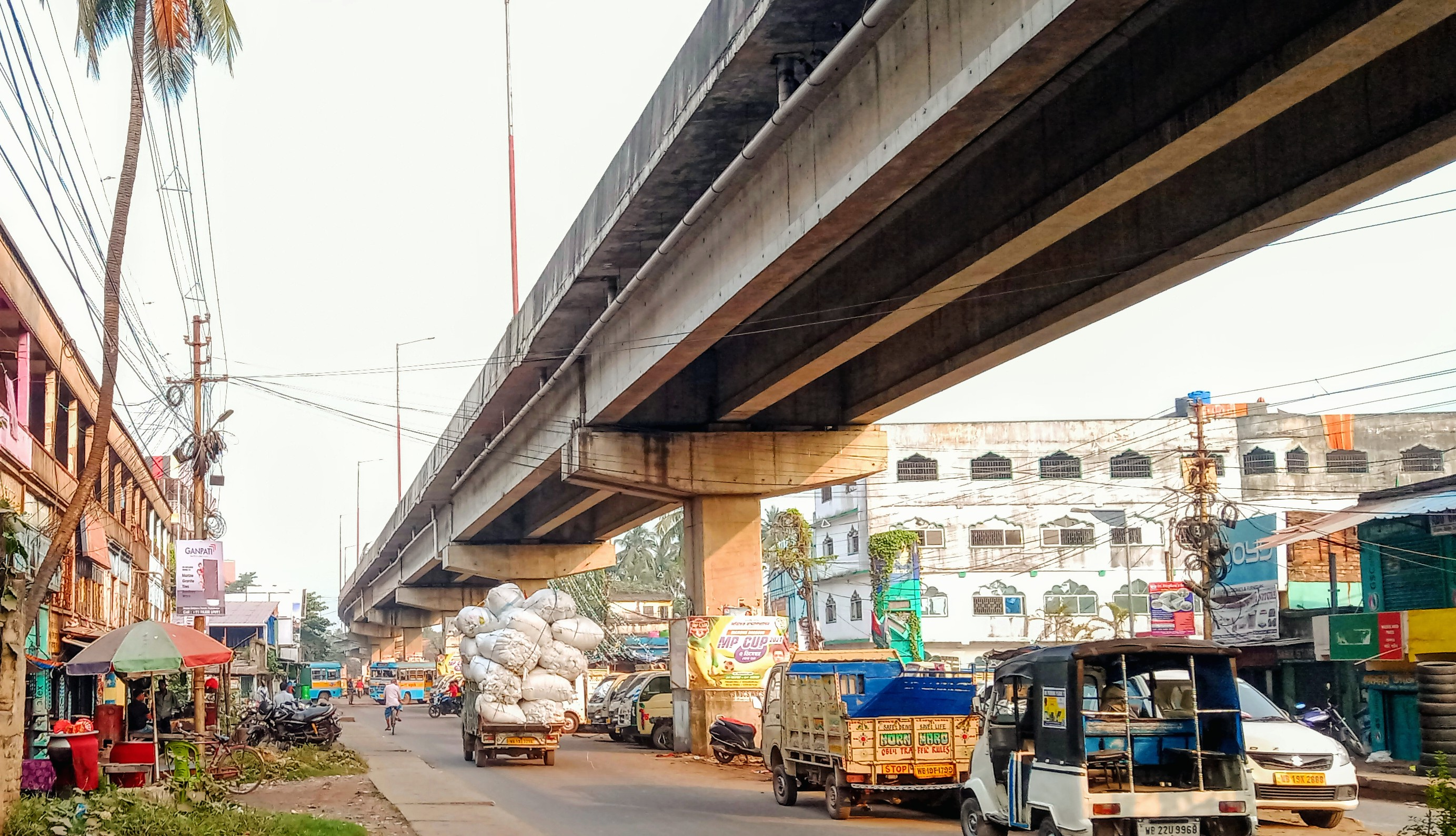
The flyover provides an alternative to the busy and narrow BBT Road

This flyover will benefit around 10 lakh (1 million) people who commute daily along this route from Pujali, Budge Budge, Maheshtala and Asuti gram panchayat. It will also help those residing in housing projects like Batanagar Riverside Township, Eden City, Greenfield City and Purti.

== Problem ==
West Bengal's longest flyover, which connects Jinjira Bazar to Batanagar across Maheshtala in the southern part of the city, has developed cracks barely a year since it was opened to traffic, a senior official of the Kolkata Metropolitan Development Authority (KMDA)said. The cracks were detected on pillars 121 and 122 of the 7 km-long Sampriti (Harmony) flyover on during an inspection and vehicular movement on it was stopped soon afterwards.
