= Batanagar =

Neighbourhood in Maheshtala, West Bengal, India

- Neighbourhood in Maheshtala
- Location in West Bengal Location in India
- Coordinates: 22.5133°N 88.2230°E
- Country: India
- State: West Bengal
- Division: Presidency
- District: South 24 Parganas
- Region: Greater Kolkata

Government
  - Type: Municipality
  - Body: Maheshtala Municipality
- Elevation: 9 m (30 ft)

Languages
  - Official: Bengali
  - Additional official: English
- Time zone: UTC+5:30 (IST)
- PIN: 700140
- Telephone code: +91 33
- Vehicle registration: WB-19 to WB-22, WB-95 to WB-99
- Lok Sabha constituency: Diamond Harbour
- Vidhan Sabha constituency: Maheshtala
- Website: www.maheshtalamunicipality.org

Batanagar is a neighbourhood in Maheshtala of the South 24 Parganas district in the Indian state of West Bengal. It is a part of the area covered by the Kolkata Metropolitan Development Authority (KMDA).

== History ==
Batanagar was established to build the first shoe factory in India by Czechoslovak industrialist Tomáš Baťa. The Bata brand was launched on 24 August 1894 in Zlín, then in Austria-Hungary (now in the Czech Republic). The company first established itself in India in 1931 by renting a building to start an experimental shoe production plant in Konnagar, with 75 Czechoslovak experts. Jan Antonín Baťa then built up an industrial manufacturing city called Batanagar in 1934 as well as other factories in Delhi and Patna and elsewhere in India, employing more than 7,000 people. Later, Batanagar became one of the bigger suburban cities near Kolkata.

== Geography ==
Cities and towns in the western part of Alipore Sadar subdivision (including Budge Budge I & II, Thakurpukur Maheshtala CD blocks) in South 24 Parganas district
M: municipal city/ town, CT: census town, R: rural/ urban centre,
Owing to space constraints in the small map, the actual locations in a larger map may vary slightly
Bakrahat is in Bishnupur II CD block, but Lakshmibala Rural Hospital at Bakrahat serves Budge Budge II CD block and so it is included here.

=== Area overview ===
Alipore Sadar subdivision is the most urbanized part of the South 24 Parganas district. 59.85% of the population lives in the urban areas and 40.15% lives in the rural areas. In the northern portion of the subdivision (shown in the map alongside) there are 21 census towns. The entire district is situated in the Ganges Delta and the subdivision, on the east bank of the Hooghly River, is an alluvial stretch, with industrial development.

Note: The map alongside presents some of the notable locations in the subdivision. All places marked in the map are linked in the larger full screen map.

=== Location ===
Batanagar is located at 22°30′48″N 88°13′23″E. It has an average elevation of 9 metres (30 ft).

== Economy ==
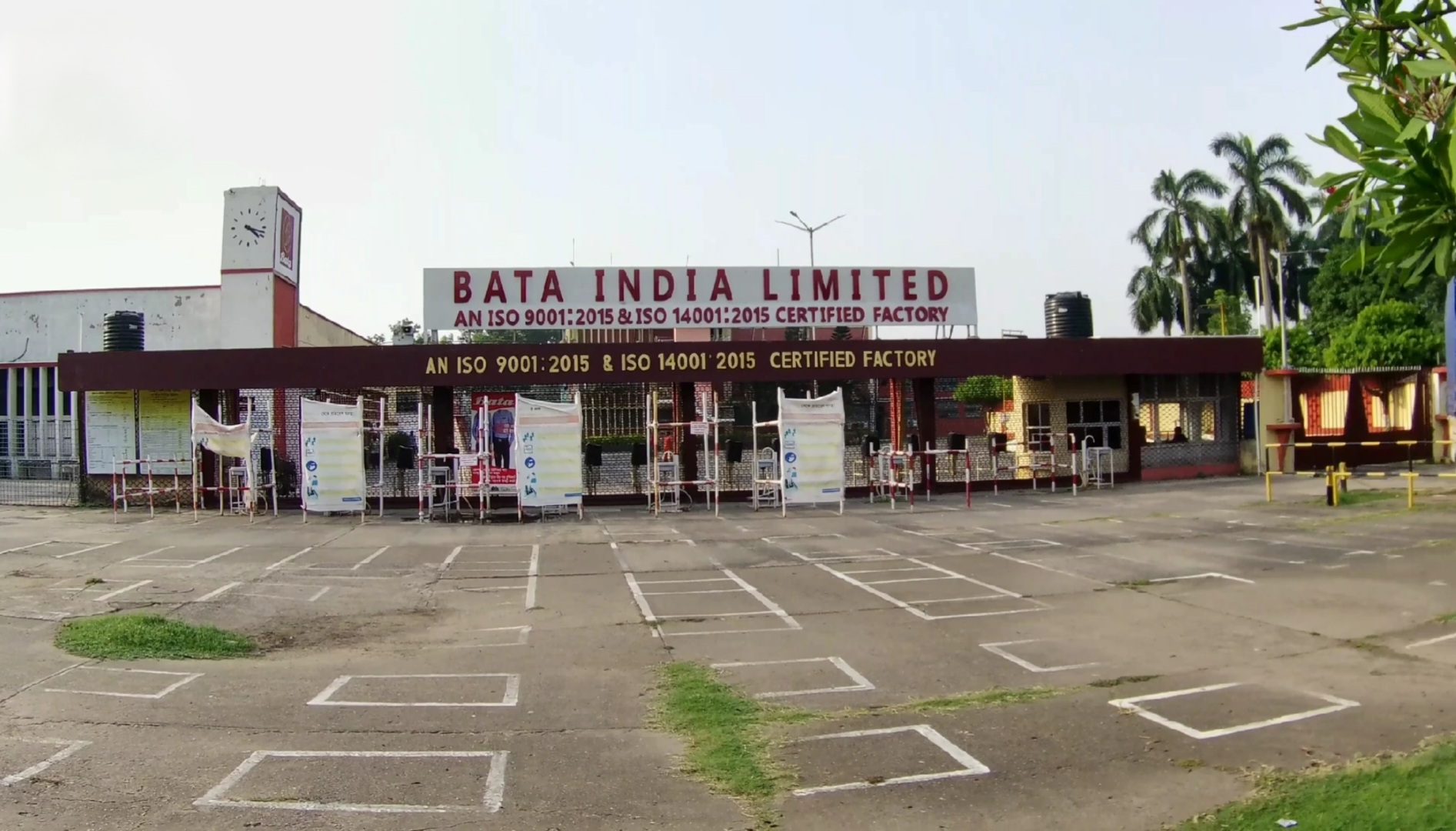
Entrance of the Bata shoe factory

It is one of the places named after the multinational shoe company Bata. There is a plant of the Bata company here. The employees mostly reside in Batanagar. Shoe-making is a predominant cottage industry in Batanagar, with houses and families dedicated to manufacturing shoes from leather, PVC, jute, etc. for shoe brands in India. For example - Khadim's, Sreeleathers, Titas and Liberty have outsourced a major portion of their shoe making process to the various entities in Batanagar.

This feature was born out of necessity, as most of the families residing in Batanagar are dependent on the Bata factory for their livelihood, hence whenever the factory gets locked-out, these families are very severely affected. Hence shoe making from their homes has given them an alternate source of earning.

== Education ==
Techno International Batanagar, established in 2012, offers diploma, undergraduate and postgraduate degree courses in Engineering and Technology and other allied fields.

== Transport ==
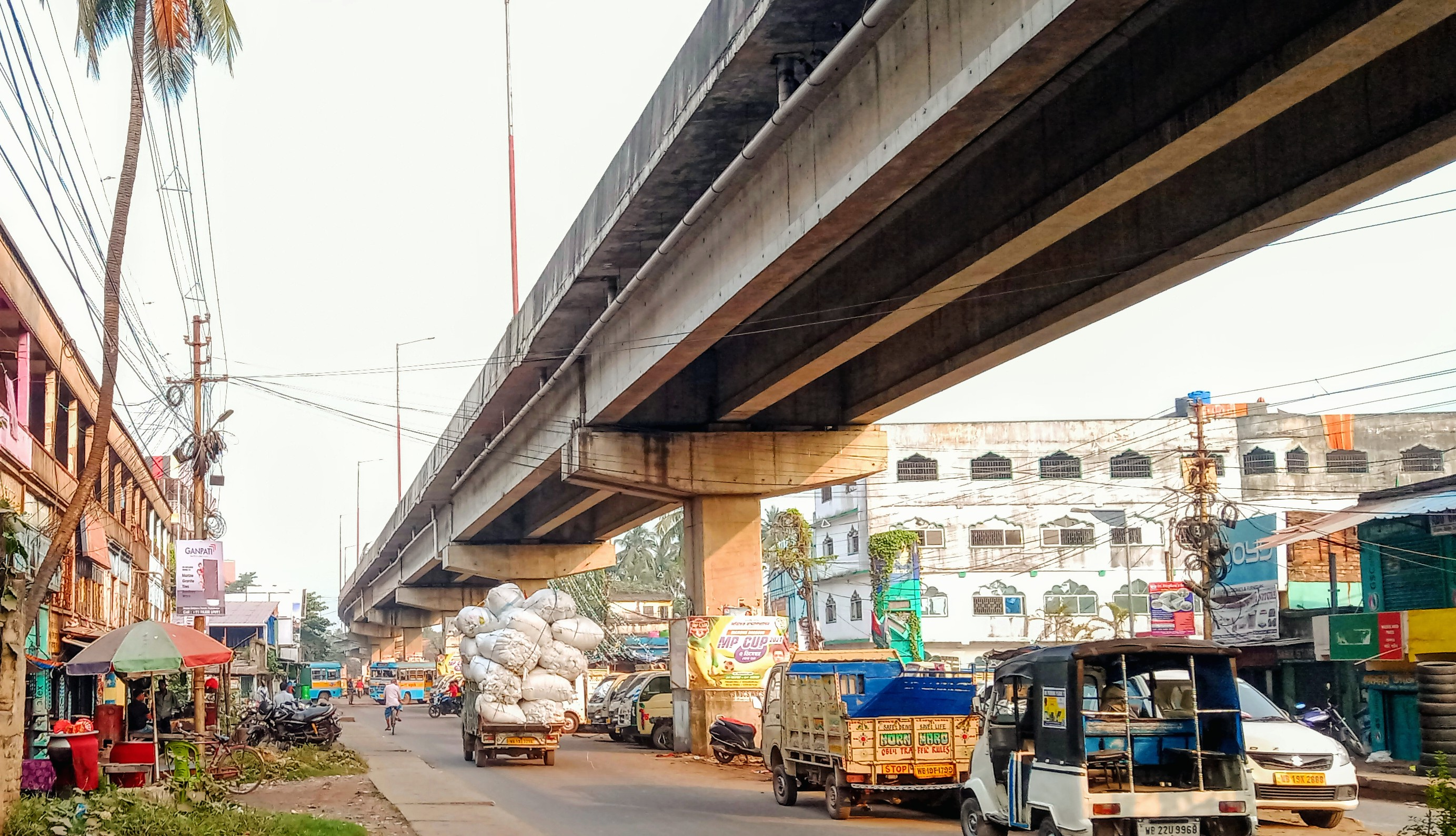
Batanagar Flyover along with the BBT Road

Batanagar is on the Budge Budge Trunk Road.

Nangi railway station is located nearby.

== Notable residents ==
- Smaranjit Chakraborty, Writer
