= Nature Park of India =

Nature Park
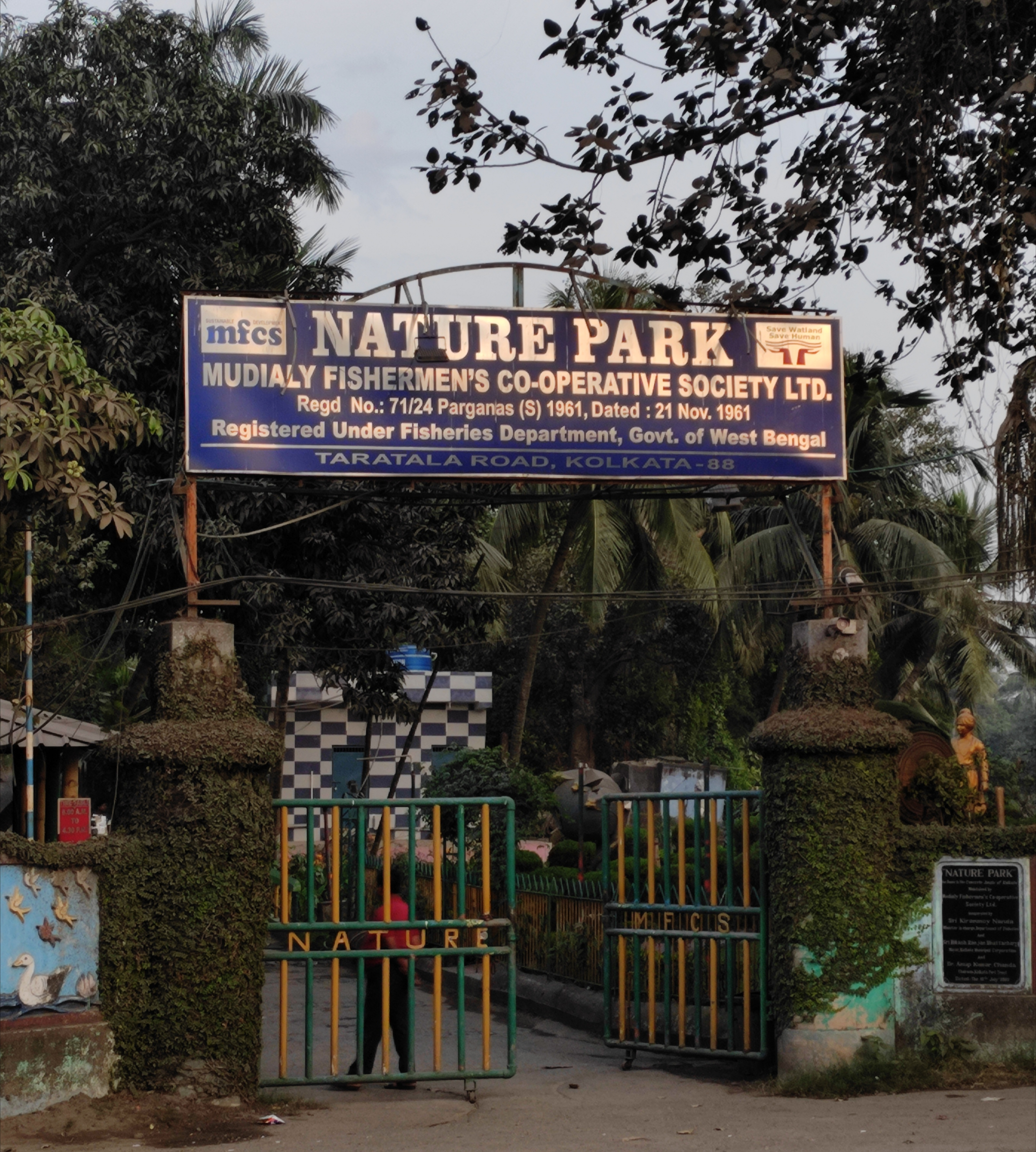

- Location in Kolkata
- Location: Taratala Rd, Paharpur, Garden Reach, Kolkata, West Bengal 700088; India
- Coordinates: 22°31′26″N 88°17′35″E
- Status: Operating
- Owner: Government of West Bengal
- Operated by: Mudialy Fisherman’s Co-operative Society Ltd.
- Theme: Nature park
- Operating season: 8.00 AM - 5.00 PM
- Attendance: 1.5 million p.a

The Nature Park of India is a reserved area administered by the Government of India. It is located in the Garden Reach area of Kolkata.

== Transport ==
Brace Bridge railway station and Santoshpur railway station are nearest railway stations.

Two Route Autos runs through Nature Park are:

- Taratala to Ramnagar (via Nature Park)
- Taratala to Santoshpur (via Nature Park)

Another new auto service has started from Nature Park to Santoshpur near Nature Park Out Post.

Several Buses passes through Nature Park are:

- 1B Ramnagar - Garia Station
- 12 Rajabagan - Esplanade/Rajabazar
- 12AD Akra Phatak - Howrah Station
- S-46 Rabindra Nagar - Karunamoyee (Salt Lake)
- 42B Bichali Ghat - Garia Station
- SD-27 Akra Phatak - Dostipur

== See also ==
- Nicco Park
- Eco Park
- Millennium Park
