= Chata Kalikapur =

- Census Town
- Location in West Bengal Location in India
- Coordinates: 22.4775°N 88.2627°E
- Country: India
- State: West Bengal
- District: South 24 Parganas
- CD block: Thakurpukur Maheshtala

Area
  - Total: 5.66 km^{2} (2.19 sq mi)
- Elevation: 9 m (30 ft)

Population (2011)
  - Total: 24,985
  - Density: 4,410/km^{2} (11,400/sq mi)

Languages
  - Official: Bengali
  - Additional official: English
- Time zone: UTC+5:30 (IST)
- PIN: 700140
- Telephone code: +91 33
- Vehicle registration: WB-19 to WB-22, WB-95 to WB-99
- Lok Sabha constituency: Diamond Harbour
- Vidhan Sabha constituency: Bishnupur (SC)
- Website: www.s24pgs.gov.in

Chata Kalikapur is a census town in the Thakurpukur Maheshtala CD block in the Alipore Sadar subdivision of the South 24 Parganas district in the Indian state of West Bengal.

== Geography ==
Cities and towns in the western part of Alipore Sadar subdivision (including Budge Budge I & II, Thakurpukur Maheshtala CD blocks) in South 24 Parganas district
M: municipal city/ town, CT: census town, R: rural/ urban centre,
Owing to space constraints in the small map, the actual locations in a larger map may vary slightly
Bakrahat is in Bishnupur II CD block, but Lakshmibala Rural Hospital at Bakrahat serves Budge Budge II CD block and so it is included here.

=== Area overview ===
Alipore Sadar subdivision is the most urbanized part of the South 24 Parganas district. 59.85% of the population lives in the urban areas and 40.15% lives in the rural areas. In the northern portion of the subdivision (shown in the map alongside) there are 21 census towns. The entire district is situated in the Ganges Delta and the subdivision, on the east bank of the Hooghly River, is an alluvial stretch, with industrial development.

Note: The map alongside presents some of the notable locations in the subdivision. All places marked in the map are linked in the larger full screen map.

=== Location ===
Chata Kalikapur is located at 22°28′39″N 88°15′46″E. It has an average elevation of 9 metres (30 ft).

Rameswarpur, Chata Kalikapur, Ganye Gangadharpur and Asuti form a cluster of census towns on the southern side of Maheshtala, as per the map of the Thakurpukur Maheshtala CD block on page 153 of the District Census Handbook 2011 for the South 24 Parganas.

== Demographics ==
According to the 2011 Census of India, Chata Kalikapur had a total population of 24,985, of which 12,709 (51%) were males and 12,276 (49%) were females. There were 3,318 persons in the age range of 0 to 6 years. The total number of literate persons was 16,715 (77.15% of the population over 6 years).

According to the 2001 Census of India, Chata Kalikapur had a population of 20,087. Males constitute 51% of the population and females 49%. It has an average literacy rate of 57%, lower than the national average of 59.5%; with male literacy of 63% and female literacy of 52%. 15% of the population is under 6 years of age.

=== Kolkata Urban Agglomeration ===
The following municipalities and census towns in the South 24 Parganas district were part of the Kolkata Urban Agglomeration in the 2011 census: Maheshtala (M), Joka (CT), Balarampur (CT), Chata Kalikapur (CT), Budge Budge (M), Nischintapur (CT), Uttar Raypur (CT), Pujali (M) and Rajpur Sonarpur (M).

== Infrastructure ==
According to the District Census Handbook 2011, Chata Kalikapur covered an area of 5.66 km^{2}. Among the civic amenities, it has 30 km of roads with open drains. The source of protected water supply is a borewell tank and overhead tank. It has 2,000 domestic electric connections and 200 road lights. Among the medical facilities are a family welfare centre and a nursing home 3 km away. Among the educational facilities are 14 primary schools, 2 middle schools, 3 secondary schools, 1 senior secondary school and the nearest general degree college is at Maheshtala 6 km away. It has 2 recognised typewriting, shorthand and vocational training centres. Three important commodities manufactured sre: ready-made garments, grill and dyeing. It has a branch of a nationalised bank.

== Transport ==
A short stretch of local roads link Chata Kalikapur to the Budge Budge Trunk Road.

Akra railway station is located nearby.

== Education ==
Chatta Subid Ali Institute is a coeducational institution. It is affiliated with the West Bengal Board of Secondary Education.

== Healthcare ==
Sarsuna Block Primary Health Centre, with 15 beds, at Sarsuna, is the major government medical facility in the Thakurpukur Maheshtala CD block.
