= Kasturi =

Kasturi or Kasthuri may refer to:

- Deer musk, known as kasturi
- Musk, meaning of kasturi in some Indian languages
- Kasturi (2023 TV series), a Marathi soap opera
- Kasturi (2007 TV series), a Hindi soap opera
- Kasthuri (TV series), a Tamil soap opera
- Kasthuri, a Telugu soap opera
- Kasthuri (TV channel), a 24-hour Kannada-language television channel
- Kasthuri (magazine), a monthly family magazine in Kannada language
- Kasturi (1980 film), a 1980 Hindi film directed by Bimal Dutta
- Kasturi-class corvette, a ship class of the Royal Malaysian Navy

== People ==
- Kasturi Chellaraja Wilson, a Sri Lankan business personality
- Kasturi Pattanaik (born 1966), an Indian classical dancer
- Hang Kasturi, a legendary warrior represented on the coat of arms of Malacca, Malaysia
- Kasthuri (actress), an Indian actress
- Kasthuri Raja, an Indian film director
- Kasturi Ranga Iyengar (1859–1923), an Indian lawyer, freedom fighter, politician and journalist
- Kasturi Das, Indian politician from West Bengal

== Plants ==
- Mangifera casturi, a species of mango from Kalimantan, Borneo known as kasturi
