= Asuti =

- Census Town
- Location in West Bengal Location in India
- Coordinates: 22.4571°N 88.2475°E
- Country: India
- State: West Bengal
- District: South 24 Parganas
- CD block: Thakurpukur Maheshtala

Area
  - Total: 1.68 km^{2} (0.65 sq mi)
- Elevation: 9 m (30 ft)

Population (2011)
  - Total: 6,272
  - Density: 3,730/km^{2} (9,670/sq mi)

Languages
  - Official: Bengali
  - Additional official: English
- Time zone: UTC+5:30 (IST)
- PIN: 700141
- Telephone code: +91 33
- Vehicle registration: WB-19 to WB-22, WB-95 to WB-99
- Lok Sabha constituency: Diamond Harbour
- Vidhan Sabha constituency: Bishnupur (SC)
- Website: www.s24pgs.gov.in

Asuti is a census town and a gram panchayat within the jurisdiction of the Maheshtala police station in the Thakurpukur Maheshtala CD block in the Alipore Sadar subdivision of the South 24 Parganas district in the Indian state of West Bengal.

== Geography ==
Cities and towns in the western part of Alipore Sadar subdivision (including Budge Budge I & II, Thakurpukur Maheshtala CD blocks) in South 24 Parganas district
M: municipal city/ town, CT: census town, R: rural/ urban centre,
Owing to space constraints in the small map, the actual locations in a larger map may vary slightly
Bakrahat is in Bishnupur II CD block, but Lakshmibala Rural Hospital at Bakrahat serves Budge Budge II CD block and so it is included here.

=== Area overview ===
Alipore Sadar subdivision is the most urbanized part of the South 24 Parganas district. 59.85% of the population lives in the urban areas and 40.15% lives in the rural areas. In the northern portion of the subdivision (shown in the map alongside) there are 21 census towns. The entire district is situated in the Ganges Delta and the subdivision, on the east bank of the Hooghly River, is an alluvial stretch, with industrial development.

Note: The map alongside presents some of the notable locations in the subdivision. All places marked in the map are linked in the larger full screen map.

=== Location ===
Asuti is located at 22°27′26″N 88°14′51″E. It has an average elevation of 9 metres (30 ft).

Rameswarpur, Chata Kalikapur, Ganye Gangadharpur and Asuti form a cluster of census towns on the southern side of Maheshtala, as per the map of Thakurpukur Maheshtala CD block on page 153 of the District Census Handbook 2011 for the South 24 Parganas.

== Demographics ==
According to the 2011 Census of India, Asuti had a total population of 6,272, of which 3,242 (52%) were males and 3,030 (48%) were females. There were 664 persons in the age range of 0 to 6 years. The total number of literate persons in Asuti was 4,719 (84.15% of the population over 6 years).

== Infrastructure ==
According to the District Census Handbook 2011, Asuti covered an area of 1.6765 km^{2}. Nangi railway station, 5.5 km away. Among the civic amenities it had 7.5 km of roads with open drains. The source of protected water supply was borewell tank and overhead tank. It had 1,430 domestic electric connections and 30 road lights. Among the medical facilities it had were a hospital 3 km away, a nursing home 1 km away and 5 medicine shops. Among the educational facilities it had were 5 primary schools, 1 middle school, 1 secondary school, the nearest senior secondary school was at Ganney close by and the nearest general degree college was at Sarsuna 4 km away. Among the social, recreational and cultural facilities, the nearest public library and reading room were at Jot Shibrampur 3.5 km away.

== Transport ==
A short stretch of local roads link Asuti to the Budge Budge Trunk Road.

Nangi railway station is located nearby.

== Education ==
Ashuti Netaji High School is a Bengali-medium coeducational institution established in 1960. It has facilities for teaching from class v to class XII.

== Healthcare ==
Sarsuna Block Primary Health Centre, with 15 beds, at Sarsuna, is the major government medical facility in the Thakurpukur Maheshtala CD block.
