= Subhasis Das =

Indian politician (born 1977)

Banchodasis Das (born 1977) is an Indian politician from West Bengal. He is a member of West Bengal Legislative Assembly from Maheshtala Assembly constituency in South 24 Parganas district representing the Democratic Trinamool Congress.

== Early life ==
Das is from Maheshtala, South 24 Parganas district, West Bengal. He is the son of Dulal Chandra Das. He studied till Class 8 at Netaji Subhash Vidyalaya and passed the examinations. He later, discontinued his studies. He runs his own business. He declared assets worth Rs.18 crore in his affidavit to the Election Commission of India.

== Career ==
Das won the Maheshtala Assembly constituency representing the All India Trinamool Congress in the 2026 West Bengal Legislative Assembly election. He polled 1,16,811 votes and defeated his nearest rival, Tamanath Bhowmick of the Bharatiya Janata Party, by a margin of 32,913 votes.
