= Kasturi Das =

Indian politician (1953 – 2018)

Kasturi Das (1953 – 2018) was an Indian politician from West Bengal. She was a two time member of the West Bengal Legislative Assembly from Maheshtala Assembly constituency in South 24 Parganas district. She won the seat in the 2011 and 2016 West Bengal Legislative Assembly elections, representing the All India Trinamool Congress. She died in 2018 necessitating a by-election which was won by her husband Dulal Das.

== Early life and education ==
Das was from Maheshtala, South 24 Parganas district, West Bengal. She married Dulal Das. She studied Class 8 at Shyam Prasad Girls School and passed the examinations under Madhyamik Board. She discontinued her studies after Class 8. Her husband runs his own business.

== Career ==
Das won from Maheshtala Assembly constituency representing the All India Trinamool Congress in the 2011 West Bengal Legislative Assembly election. She polled votes and defeated her nearest rival, Sheikh Mohammed Israil of the Communist Party of India (Marxist), by a margin of 24,283 votes. She retained the seat for Trinamool Congress winning the 2016 West Bengal Legislative Assembly election. She defeated Samik Lahiri of the CPI (M) by a margin of 12,452 votes.

== Death ==
She died in 2018.
