= Bartala =

- Neighbourhood in Kolkata (Calcutta)
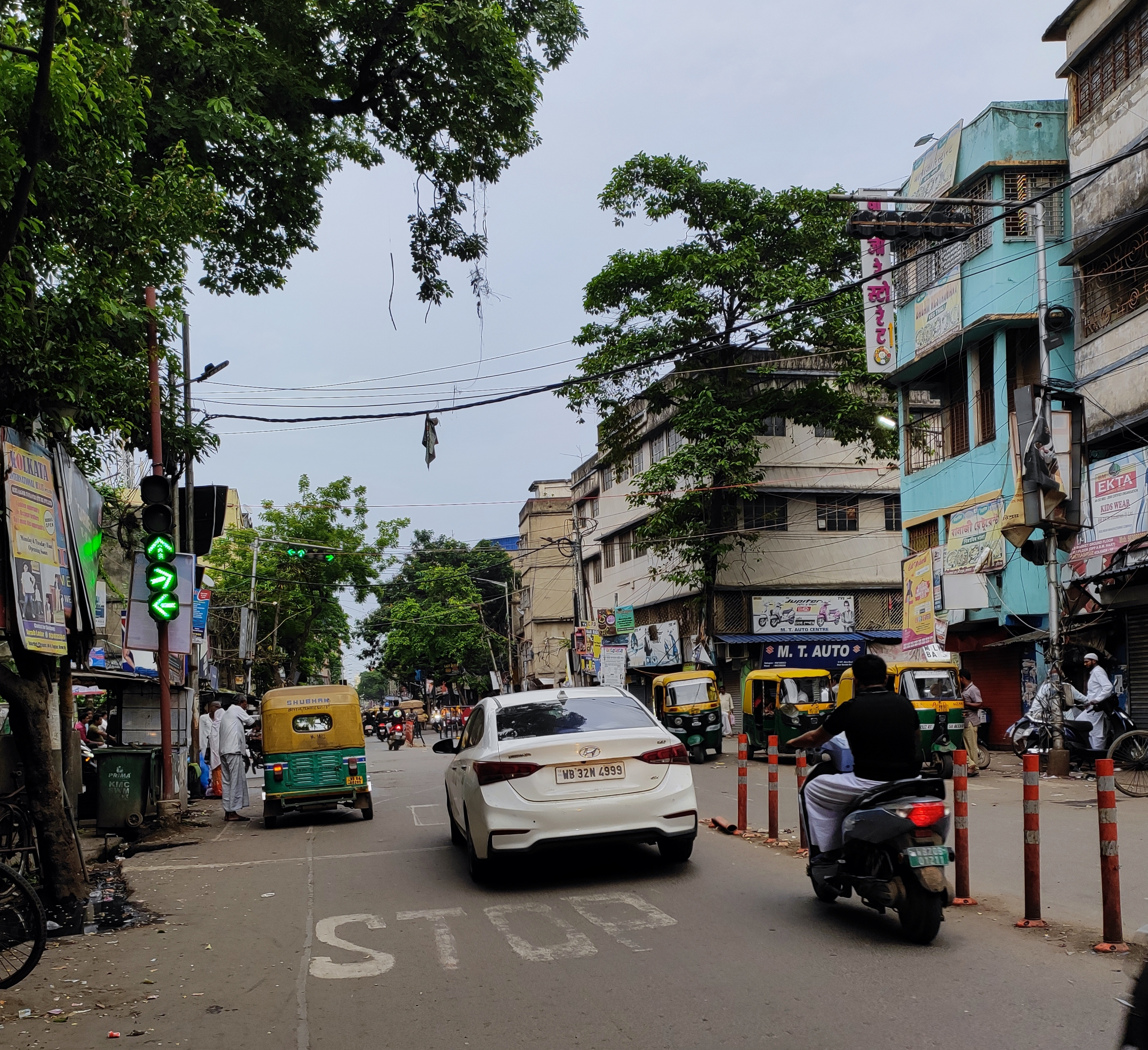
- Bartala Rail Line More

- Location in Kolkata
- Coordinates: 22°32′30″N 88°16′05″E
- Country: India
- State: West Bengal
- City: Kolkata
- District: Kolkata
- Kolkata Suburban Railway: Santoshpur railway station
- KMC ward: 139
- Time zone: UTC+5:30 (IST)
- PIN: 700018

Bartala is a locality of Kolkata in West Bengal, India. It is situated in the south-western part of Kolkata near to Metiabruz and Garden Reach on the east and Akra Phatak on the west. The area is populated with mainly Muslims. It has a post office named Bartala Post office with PIN 700018.

== Geography ==
=== Police district ===
Rajabagan police station is part of Port division of Kolkata Police. It is located at T-250 Garden Reach Road, Kolkata-700044.

Watgunge Women police station, located at 16, Watgunge Street, Kolkata-700023, covers all police districts under the jurisdiction of the Port division i.e. North Port, South Port, Watgunge, West Port, Garden Reach, Ekbalpur, Nadial, Rajabagan and Metiabruz.

Jadavpur, Thakurpukur, Behala, Purba Jadavpur, Tiljala, Regent Park, Metiabruz, Nadial and Kasba police stations were transferred from South 24 Parganas to Kolkata in 2011. Except Metiabruz, all the police stations were split into two. The new police stations are Parnasree, Haridevpur, Garfa, Patuli, Survey Park, Pragati Maidan, Bansdroni and Rajabagan.
