= Kasturi Pattanaik =

Indian dancer and choreographer

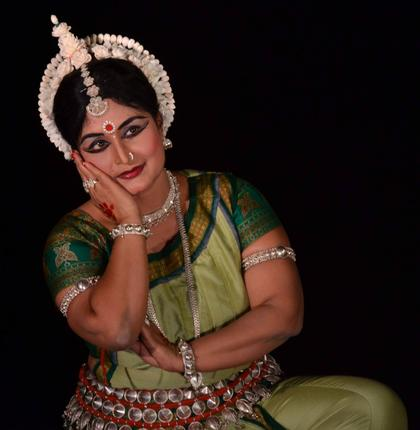

Background information
- Born: Kasturi Badu; 3 August 1965 (age 61); Cuttack, India
- Origin: India
- Genres: Indian classical dance
- Occupations: Performing Artist Indian classical dance (Odissi Dance) exponent, choreographer, teacher
- Years active: 1975–present
- Website: www.kasturipattanaik.com

Kasturi Pattanaik is a pioneering Odissi dance exponent, performer, choreographer, teacher, trainer and music composer from India.

== Profile ==
Kasturi Pattanaik’s compositions and choreographies in the Odissi dance are successful for originality and diversity. She has introduced many concepts and ideas in the Odissi dance repertory.

Pattanaik is an accomplished soloist and group performer, one of the pioneers of Odissi dance drama, blending the classical and folk traditions of Odisha and pan-Indian mythological stories. Being an Odissi music composer, Pattanaik has integrated Odissi music in its original format in her compositions and choreographies in Odissi dance.

Kasturi Pattanaik started her Odissi dance learning, along with Kathak Dance from her childhood. After completing her graduation from the prestigious Shailabala Women's College, Cuttack, Odisha; she joined Odissi Research Centre (ORC), Bhubaneswar in its first batch for her advanced intensive course in Odissi dance.

Pattanaik has the distinction of learning and performing under the foremost Odissi dance Gurus/maestros; including Late Raghunath Dutta, Late Padma Vibhushan Kelucharan Mohapatra, Padma Shri Kumkum Mohanty, Padma Shri Gangadhar Pradhan, Ramani Ranjan Jena and Dayanidhi Das.

From an early age, she travelled across the country and world to perform and disseminate Odissi dance. She also conducted workshops in various countries; including in Hong Kong, USSR, Indonesia, Thailand, Singapore, North Korea and China.

Pattanaik has trained more than four hundred students across the country and abroad in Odissi dance; many of whom have established themselves either as acclaimed performers or as Gurus.

After her stint in Odissi Research Centre as the choreographer; she moved to New Delhi and joined the India’s national nodal cultural organization-‘SANKALP’ as its Programme Director (Culture) and Creative Head. In SANKALP, she broadened her arena of activities to include education, research and policy strategies; besides her main activities related to promotion of Indian Art and Culture.

She has also served the Ministry of Culture, Government of India in its various expert committees.

Pattanaik has also performed leading roles in Odia Films and National Doordarshan Channel serials. Her Doordarshan serial on ‘Debadasi” is a classic masterpiece on Debadasi traditions.

She was a member of Regional Committee of the Central Board of Film Certification. She has also anchored eight episodes of primary education programmes, produced by the State Institute of Technology (SIT), Bhubaneswar under the Ministry of Human Resource Development, Government of India.

She has played a pioneering role in syllabus preparation for B.A & B.A. (Hons.) courses in Odissi Dance of Indira Kala Sangeet Vishwavidyalaya (IKSVV), Khairagarh, Chhattisgarh. She has also served as the Jury of the ‘Kalidas Samman’ and ‘Tulsi Samman’, prestigious arts awards, presented annually by the Government of Madhya Pradesh.

She has also received a number of awards and acclaims for her achievements in promoting the diversity of Indian culture expressions.

== Achievements and contributions ==
Pattanaik is still with SANKALP, an NGO described as "very good" and "of particular interest" by the Government of India Committee, headed by J. S. Verma, former Chief Justice of India. As the programme director for culture, Pattanaik promotes cultural and natural heritage.

She has created nine pallavis:

- Charukeshi
- Pattadeep
- Gati Sammikrutta
- Hansadhwoni
- Narayani
- Janasammohini
- Asavari
- Bageshri
- Sankaravaran-1-for the beginners
- Sankaravaran-2
- Koushik Dhwoni
- Yog

Dance dramas include:

- The Deer Krishnasara (Krushnasara Mruga)
- Yama Savitri Sambad
- Rasa Trayee
- Kanchi Abhiyan
- Chitrangada
- Sthitaprajna
- Sabari Upakhyanam

== ICCR Empanelled Artist ==
Kasturi Pattanaik is empanelled in the Indian Council for Cultural Relations (ICCR).

== Honours ==
- Rajendra Prasad Puraskar from "Rajendra Prasad Smruti Sansad" at Cuttack, Orissa, 1997
- "Abhinandanika – 1999" for excellent Abhinay in Odissi dance from Vishnupriya Smruti Sammana at Puri, Orissa
- Scholarships from the state in 1987 and the Ministry of Human Resource Development in 2000
- "Debadasi Samman" from Udayan Sanskritik Anusthan, 2003
- Juries of the Central Board of Film Certification for 2002
- Honoured from Kuchipudi Natyakala Mandali in Kuchipudi District, Andhra Pradesh in 1999
- Mahari Award-2015, instituted by Adi Guru Pankaj Charan Das

== Festivals ==
- India Festival, USSR, 1987
- Spring Festival, North Korea, 1990 (ICCR)
- Kalinga Bali Yatra (Indonesia, Jakarta, Bali, Singapore, Thailand)
- Solo Performances (Hong Kong, China, Japan), 1994
- Khajuraho Festival, 1992 and 2007
- Ekamra Utsav, 2007
- Ellora Festival, 1991
- Nisagandhi Festival, 1989
- Surya Festival, 1990, 1992, 2010
- Sidhendra Yogi Dance Festival, Kuchipudi, 1998, 1999, 2000
- Udaya Shankar Dance Festivals, 2000
- Konark Dance Festival, 1989 to 2004
- Konarka Nata Mandap Festival, 1988
- Central SNA Youth Festivals
- Yuva Nrita Utsav, 1992, 1996, 2003
- Odissi International, Bhubaneswar, 2010
- Utkal Divas-Rourkela, 2010, 2014
- SANKALP Festival Series, Mysore 2010 and Benguluru 2010
- Commonwealth Game, New Delhi, 2010
- Oriya Cinema 75 Years Celebration Day, Bhubaneswar, 2011
- Utkal Devas, Dehradun, 2011
- Inaugural Function of 150th Birth Anniversary of Guru Rabindranath Tagore, Bhopal, 2011
- Betwa Mahotsav, Vidisha, 2011
- Satna Mahotsav, Satna, 2012
- SANKALP’s National Festival on New Creations in Odissi Dance, 2012
- Konark Festival, 2012
- Khajuraho Festival, 2014

== Research ==
Kasturi Pattanaik was the Program Coordinator of the Planning Commission, Government of India research project titled “Promotion of Diversity of India’s Cultural Expressions- An Impact Assessment Study of Central Sangeet Natak Academy (SNA)’. It is a significant study on one of the premier autonomous cultural bodies of the Ministry of Culture, Government of India.

== See also ==
- Indian women in dance
- Odissi
