= Maheshtala Assembly constituency =

Constituency of the West Bengal Legislative Assembly, in India

Maheshtala
- Constituency No. 155 for the West Bengal Legislative Assembly
- Interactive Map Outlining Maheshtala Assembly Constituency

Constituency details
- Country: India
- Region: East India
- State: West Bengal
- District: South 24 Parganas
- Lok Sabha constituency: Diamond Harbour
- Established: 1951
- Total electors: 270,858
- Reservation: None

Member of Legislative Assembly
- 18th West Bengal Legislative Assembly
- Incumbent Subhasis Das
- Party: DTC
- Elected year: 2026

Maheshtala Assembly constituency is a Legislative Assembly constituency of South 24 Parganas district in the Indian State of West Bengal.

== Overview ==
As per order of the Delimitation Commission in respect of the Delimitation of constituencies in the West Bengal, Maheshtala Assembly constituency is composed of the following:

- Ward Nos. 8, 11, 12, 13, 14, 15, 16, 17, 18, 19, 20, 21, 22, 23, 24, 25, 26, 27, 28, 29, 30, 31, 32, 33, 34 and 35 of Maheshtala Municipality.

Maheshtala Assembly constituency is a part of No. 21 Diamond Harbour Lok Sabha constituency.

== Members of the Legislative Assembly ==
Year	Name	Party
1952	Sudhir Chandra Bhandari	Communist Party of India
1957	Sudhir Chandra Bhandari	Communist Party of India
1962	Ahammad Ali Mufti	Indian National Congress
1967	Sudhir Chandra Bhandari	Communist Party of India (Marxist)
1969	Sudhir Chandra Bhandari	Communist Party of India (Marxist)
1971	Sudhir Chandra Bhandari	Communist Party of India (Marxist)
1972	Bhupen Bijali	Indian National Congress
1977	Sudhir Chandra Bhandari	Communist Party of India (Marxist)
1982	Mir Abdus Sayeed	Communist Party of India (Marxist)
1987	Abul Basar	Communist Party of India (Marxist)
1991	Abul Basar	Communist Party of India (Marxist)
1996	Mursalin Molla	Communist Party of India (Marxist)
2001	Mursalin Molla	Communist Party of India (Marxist)
2006	Mursalin Molla	Communist Party of India (Marxist)
2011	Kasturi Das	Trinamool Congress
2016	Kasturi Das	Trinamool Congress
2018^	Dulal Chandra Das	Trinamool Congress
2021	Dulal Chandra Das	Trinamool Congress
2026	Subhasis Das	Trinamool Congress

- ^ denotes by-election

== Election results ==
=== 2026 ===
2026 West Bengal Legislative Assembly election: Maheshtala
Party	Candidate	Votes	%	±%
AITC	Subhasis Das	116,811	50.83	▼5.55
BJP	Tamanath Bhowmik	83,898	36.51	▲6.48
CPI(M)	Sayan Banerjee	21,222	9.24	▼2.25
INC	Haji Abdul Hannan	3,134	1.36	
NOTA	None of the above	1,273	0.55	▼0.38
Majority		32,913	14.32	▼12.03
Turnout		229,791	94.36	▲13.19
AITC hold		Swing		

=== 2021 ===
2021 West Bengal Legislative Assembly election: Maheshtala
Party	Candidate	Votes	%	±%
AITC	Dulal Chandra Das	124,008	56.38	
BJP	Umesh Das	66,059	30.03	▲13.13
CPI(M)	Pravat Chowdhury	25,276	11.49	▼0.96
NOTA	None of the above	2,049	0.93	
Majority		57,949	26.35	
Turnout		219,969	81.17	
AITC hold		Swing		

=== 2018 bypoll ===
West Bengal Legislative Assembly by-election, 2018: Maheshtala
Party	Candidate	Votes	%	±%
AITC	Dulal Chandra Das	104,818	59.13	▲11.29
BJP	Sujit Kumar Ghosh	42,053	16.90	▲9.29
CPI(M)	Pravat Chowdhury	30,384	12.45	▼29.03
NOTA	None of the Above	3,742	1.50	▼0.11
Majority		62,765	42.23	▲35.87
Turnout		1,81,002	72.73	▼8.16
AITC hold		Swing		

=== 2016 ===
2016 West Bengal Legislative Assembly election: Maheshtala
Party	Candidate	Votes	%	±%
AITC	Kasturi Das	93,675	47.84	▼4.66
CPI(M)	Samik Lahiri	81,223	41.48	▲2.81
BJP	Kartick Chandra Ghosh	14,909	7.61	▲5.51
NOTA	None of the Above	3,144	1.61	
Majority		12,452	6.36	▼7.47
Turnout		1,95,827	80.89	▼0.82
AITC hold		Swing		

=== 2011 ===
2011 West Bengal Legislative Assembly election: Maheshtala
Party	Candidate	Votes	%	±%
AITC	Kasturi Das	92,211	52.50	
CPI(M)	Sheikh Mohammed Israil	67,928	38.67	
Independent	Ramani Naskar	7,971	4.54	
BJP	Sisir Kumar Mukherjee	3,689	2.10	
IUML	Sagirauddin Laskar	1,882	1.07	
PDS	Debashish Bose	1,168	0.66	
Independent	Monoranjan Naskar	807	0.46	
Majority		24,283	13.83	
Turnout		1,75,656	81.71	
AITC gain from CPI(M)		Swing		

=== 2006 ===
In 2006, 2001 and 1996, Mursalin Molla of CPI(M) won the Maheshtala Assembly constituency defeating his nearest rivals Dulal Das of INC in 2006, Biman Banerjee of AITC in 2001 and Gouranga Mukherjee of INC in 1996. Abul Basar of CPI(M) defeated Malay Chowdhury of INC in 1991 and Habibur Rahman of INC in 1987. Mir Abdus Sayeed of CPI(M) defeated Dilip Ghose, Independent politician, in 1982. Sudhir Chandra Bhandari of CPI(M) defeated Mali Safiuddin of Janata Party in 1977.

=== 1972 ===
Bhupen Bijali of INC won in 1972. Sudhir Chandra Bhandari of CPI(M) won in 1971, 1969 and 1967. Ahammad Ali Mufti of INC won in 1962. Sudhir Chandra Bhandari of CPI won in 1957 and 1952.
