= Nangi railway station =

Railway station in West Bengal, India

Nangi
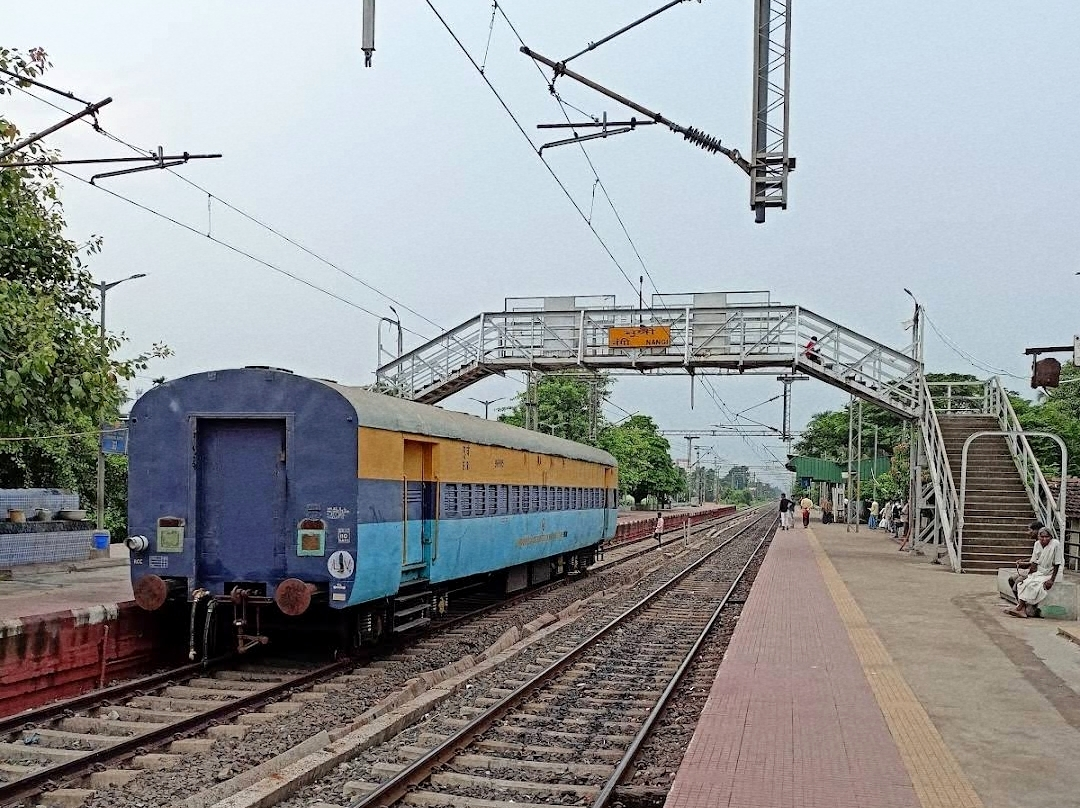

General information
- Location: Nangi Station Rd, Maheshtala, South 24 Parganas, West Bengal; India
- Coordinates: 22.500108°N 88.223371°E
- Elevation: 9 metres (30 ft)
- System: Kolkata Suburban Railway Station
- Owner: Indian Railways
- Operator: Eastern Railway
- Line: Budge Budge Branch line
- Platforms: 3
- Tracks: 3

Construction
- Structure type: Standard (on-ground station)
- Parking: Not Available
- Cycle facilities: Not Available
- Accessible: Not Available

Other information
- Status: Functioning
- Station code: NAI
- Zone(s): Eastern Railway
- Division(s): Sealdah

History
- Opened: 1890; 136 years ago
- Electrified: 1965–66
- Former names: Eastern Bengal Railway
Services
Preceding station	Kolkata Suburban Railway	Following station
Budge Budge Terminus	Sealdah South Budge Budge Branch line	Akra towards Sealdah
Route map
Location

Nangi railway station is a Kolkata Suburban Railway Station on the Budge Budge Branch line. It is under the jurisdiction of the Sealdah railway division in the Eastern Railway zone of the Indian Railways. It serves the local areas of Nangi and Batanagar in South 24 Parganas district in the Indian state of West Bengal.

== History ==
In 1890, the Eastern Bengal Railway constructed a 1,676 mm (5 ft 6 in)-wide broad-gauge railway from Ballygunge Junction to Budge Budge via Nangi.

== Electrification ==
Electrification from Ballygunge Junction to Budge Budge including Nangi was completed with 25 kV AC overhead system in 1965–66.

== Station complex ==
The platform is very much well sheltered. The station possesses many facilities including water and sanitation. There is a proper approach road to this station.
