= Santoshpur railway station =

Railway station in West Bengal, India

Santoshpur
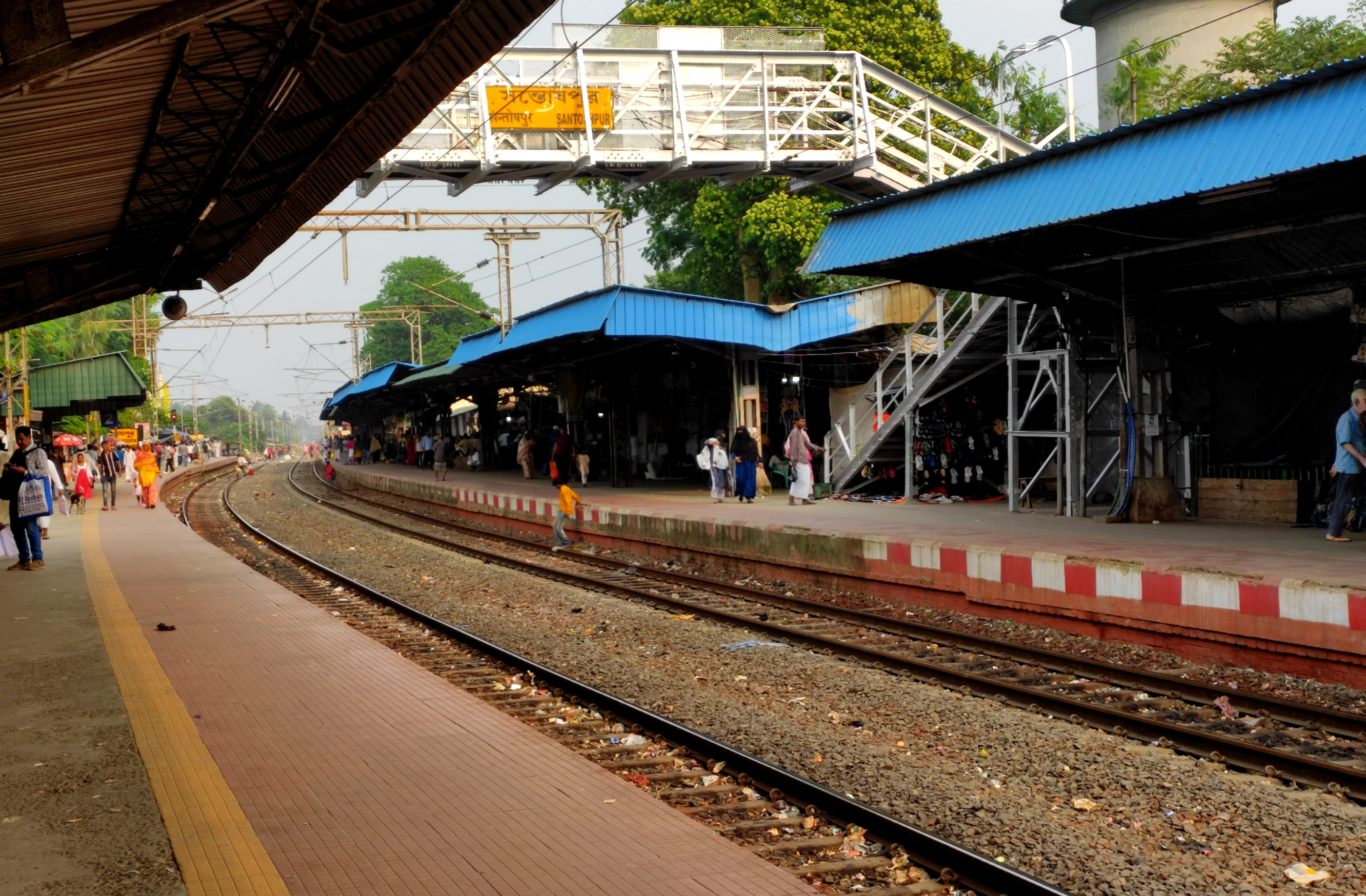

General information
- Location: Santoshpur Rd, Bidhangarh, Kolkata, West Bengal 700066; India
- Coordinates: 22.524054°N 88.271035°E
- Elevation: 9 metres (30 ft)
- System: Kolkata Suburban Railway Station
- Owner: Indian Railways
- Operator: Eastern Railway
- Line: Budge Budge Branch line
- Platforms: 2
- Tracks: 2

Construction
- Structure type: Standard (on-ground station)
- Parking: Available
- Cycle facilities: Available
- Accessible: Not Available

Other information
- Status: Functioning
- Station code: SSP
- Zone(s): Eastern Railway
- Division(s): Sealdah

History
- Opened: 1890; 136 years ago
- Electrified: 1965–66
- Former names: Eastern Bengal Railway
Services
Preceding station	Kolkata Suburban Railway	Following station
Akra towards Budge Budge	Sealdah South Budge Budge Branch line	Brace Bridge towards Sealdah
Route map
Location

Santoshpur railway station is a Kolkata Suburban Railway Station on the Budge Budge Branch line. It is under the jurisdiction of the Sealdah railway division in the Eastern Railway zone of the Indian Railways. It serves the local areas of Santoshpur and Metiabruz in South 24 Parganas district in the Indian state of West Bengal.

== History ==
In 1890, the Eastern Bengal Railway constructed a 1,676 mm (5 ft 6 in)-wide broad-gauge railway from Ballygunge Junction to Budge Budge via Santoshpur.

== Electrification ==
Electrification from Ballygunge Junction to Budge Budge including Santoshpur was completed with 25 kV AC overhead system in 1965–66.

== Station complex ==
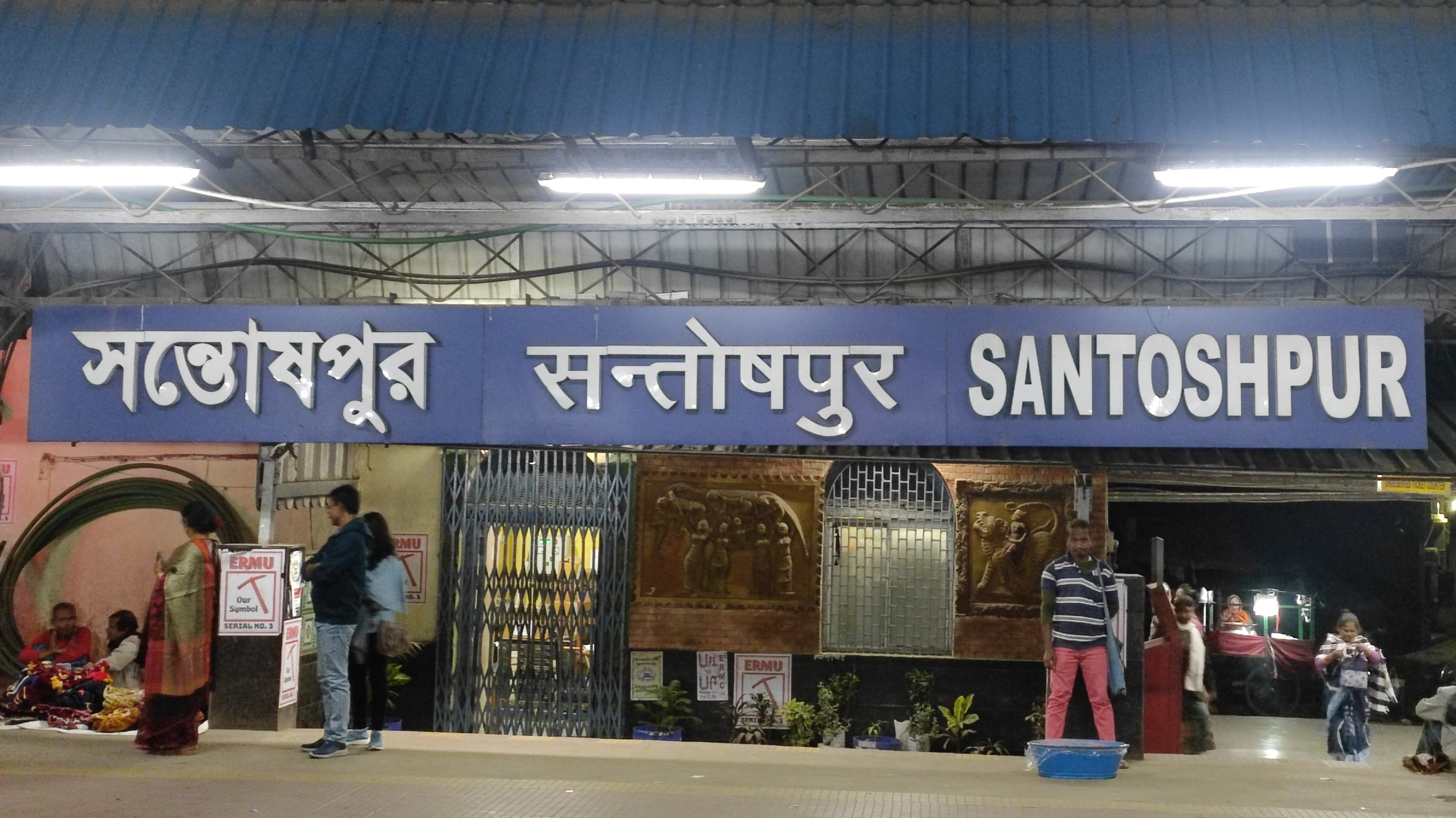

The platform is very much well sheltered. The station possesses many facilities including water and sanitation. There is a proper approach road to this station.

== Connections ==
=== Auto ===
7 Auto services are available from this station. Autos are available towards Bartala Rail Line More, Bandhabartala, Haziratan Hati Park, Akra Phatak, Taratala Crossing, Dakghar (via Kankhuli Amlitala) and Mollargate.

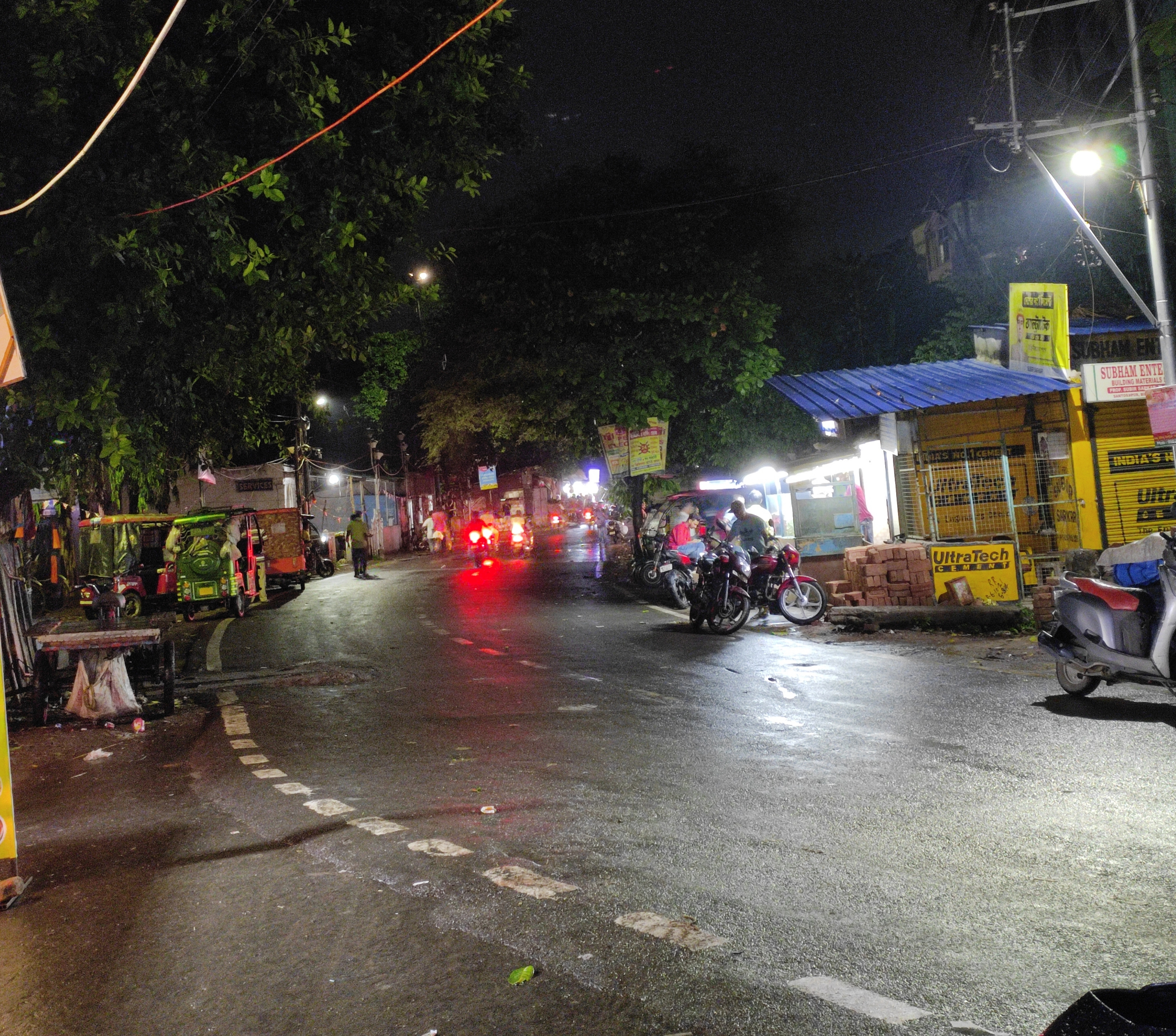
Santoshpur Rd, Bidhangarh

=== Bus ===
Several Buses ply on Santoshpur Road are:

- 12AD Akra Phatak - Howrah Station
- S-46 Rabindra Nagar - Karunamoyee (Salt Lake)
- SD-27 Akra Phatak - Dostipur
