= Maheshtala =

City in West Bengal, India

- City
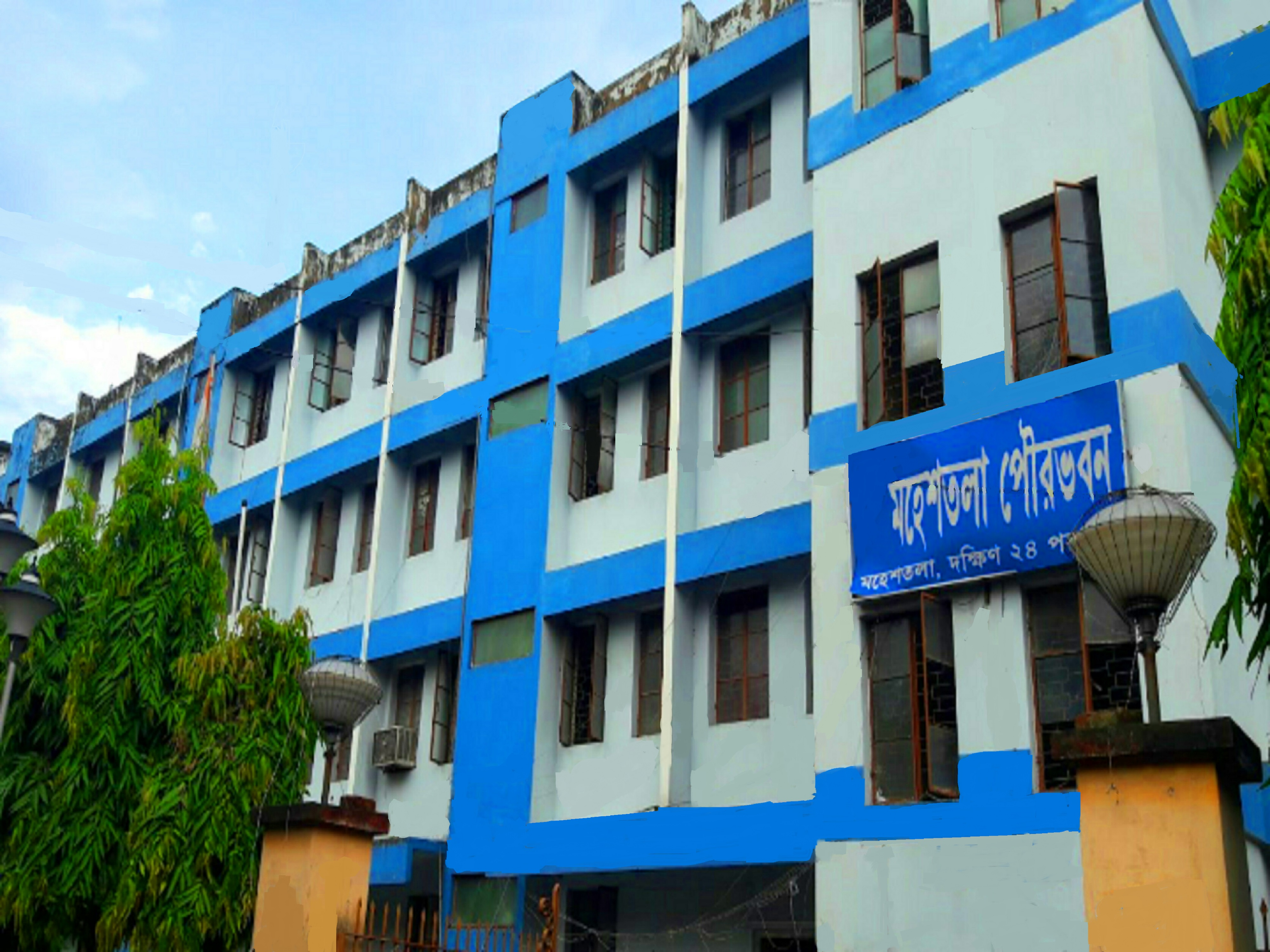
- Maheshtala Municipality
- Interactive map of Maheshtala
- Location in West Bengal Location in India Location in Asia Location in Earth
- Coordinates: 22°30′22″N 88°15′01″E
- Country: India
- State: West Bengal
- Division: Presidency
- District: South 24 Parganas

Government
  - Type: Municipality
  - Body: Maheshtala Municipality

Area
  - Total: 44.18 km^{2} (17.06 sq mi)
- Elevation: 7 m (23 ft)

Population (2011)
  - Total: 448,317
  - Density: 10,150/km^{2} (26,280/sq mi)

Demographics
  - Literacy: 82.03 per cent
  - Sex ratio: 952 ♂/♀

Languages
  - Official: Bengali
  - Additional official: English
- Time zone: UTC+5:30 (IST)
- PIN: 700018, 700024, 700044, 700060, 700061, 700063, 700066, 700082, 700088, 700104, 700139, 700140, 700141, 700142, 700143
- Telephone code: +91 33
- Vehicle registration: WB-19, WB-20, WB-95, WB-96, WB-97, WB-98
- Lok Sabha constituency: Diamond Harbour
- Vidhan Sabha constituency: Maheshtala, Metiaburuz
- Website: www.maheshtalamunicipality.org

Maheshtala (Bengali: [mɔɦeːʃt̪ɔlɑː]) is a city and a municipality of South 24 Parganas district in the Indian state of West Bengal. It is a part of the area covered by Kolkata Metropolitan Development Authority (KMDA).

== Geography ==
Cities and towns in the western part of Alipore Sadar subdivision (including Budge Budge I & II, Thakurpukur Maheshtala CD blocks) in South 24 Parganas district
M: municipal city/ town, CT: census town, R: rural/ urban centre,
Owing to space constraints in the small map, the actual locations in a larger map may vary slightly
Bakrahat is in Bishnupur II CD block, but Lakshmibala Rural Hospital at Bakrahat serves Budge Budge II CD block and so it is included here.

=== Area overview ===
Alipore Sadar subdivision is the most urbanized part of the South 24 Parganas district. 59.85% of the population lives in the urban areas and 40.15% lives in the rural areas. In the northern portion of the subdivision (shown in the map alongside) there are 21 census towns. The entire district is situated in the Ganges Delta and the subdivision, on the east bank of the Hooghly River, is an alluvial stretch, with industrial development.

Note: The map alongside presents some of the notable locations in the subdivision. All places marked in the map are linked in the larger full screen map.

=== Location ===
Maheshtala is located at 22°30′22″N 88°15′01″E. It has an average elevation of 7 metres (23 ft).

Rameswarpur, Chata Kalikapur, Ganye Gangadharpur and Asuti form a cluster of census towns on the southern side of Maheshtala, as per the map of the Thakurpukur Maheshtala CD block on the page number 153 in the District Census Handbook 2011 for the South 24 Parganas district.

=== Climate ===
Köppen-Geiger climate classification system classifies its climate as tropical wet and dry (Aw).

Climate data for Maheshtala
| Month | Jan | Feb | Mar | Apr | May | Jun | Jul | Aug | Sep | Oct | Nov | Dec | Year |
|---|---|---|---|---|---|---|---|---|---|---|---|---|---|
| Mean daily maximum °C (°F) | 25.4 (77.7) | 27.7 (81.9) | 31.4 (88.5) | 33.1 (91.6) | 33.4 (92.1) | 32.3 (90.1) | 30.7 (87.3) | 30.8 (87.4) | 31.2 (88.2) | 30.8 (87.4) | 28.1 (82.6) | 25.1 (77.2) | 30.0 (86.0) |
| Daily mean °C (°F) | 19.9 (67.8) | 22.7 (72.9) | 27 (81) | 29.3 (84.7) | 30 (86) | 29.5 (85.1) | 28.5 (83.3) | 28.6 (83.5) | 28.5 (83.3) | 27.5 (81.5) | 23.5 (74.3) | 20 (68) | 26.3 (79.3) |
| Mean daily minimum °C (°F) | 14.5 (58.1) | 17.7 (63.9) | 22.6 (72.7) | 25.6 (78.1) | 26.7 (80.1) | 26.8 (80.2) | 26.4 (79.5) | 26.4 (79.5) | 25.9 (78.6) | 24.2 (75.6) | 19 (66) | 14.6 (58.3) | 22.5 (72.6) |
| Average precipitation mm (inches) | 14 (0.6) | 17 (0.7) | 20 (0.8) | 34 (1.3) | 96 (3.8) | 244 (9.6) | 323 (12.7) | 322 (12.7) | 321 (12.6) | 172 (6.8) | 30 (1.2) | 1 (0.0) | 1,594 (62.8) |
Source: Climate-Data.org (altitude: 7 m)

== Demographics ==
=== Population ===
Historical population
| Year | Pop. | ±% |
|---|---|---|
| 2001 | 385,266 | — |
| 2011 | 448,317 | +16.4% |
Source: Census of India

According to the 2011 Census of India, Maheshtala had a total population of 448,317, of which 229,693 (51.23%) were males and 218,624 (48.77%) were females. It had a population density of 10,148 inhabitants per square kilometre (26,280/sq mi) with a sex ratio of 952 females for every 1000 males. There were 46,247 persons in the age range of 0 to 6 years which is 10.32% of the total population. The Scheduled Castes numbered 54,645 (12.19%) and the Scheduled Tribes numbered 1,934 (0.43%). The total number of literate persons was 329,813 (82.03% of the population over 6 years) out of which males numbered 176,135 (85.43% of the male population over 6 years) and females numbered 153,678 (78.45% of the female population over 6 years). Maheshtala had a total of 101,453 households as per report released by 2011 Census of India.

=== Language ===
Languages of Maheshtala (2011)
1. Bengali (95.0%)
2. Hindi (3.97%)
3. Urdu (1.06%)
4. Others (0.01%)

At the time of the 2011 Census of India, 94.96% of the population spoke Bengali, 3.97% Hindi and 1.06% Urdu as their first language.

=== Religion ===
Religion in Maheshtala (2011)
| Religion | Percent |
| Hinduism | 57.95% |
| Islam | 41.11% |
| Christianity | 0.31% |
| Sikhism | 0.12% |
| Buddhism | 0.27% |
| Jainism | 0.02% |
| Others or not stated | 0.21% |

According to the 2011 Census of India, 57.95% of the population is Hindu, 41.11% Muslim, 0.31% Christian, 0.12% Sikh, 0.27% Buddhist and 0.02% Jain. 0.21% did not state a religion in the census.

== Civic administration ==
=== Municipality ===
Maheshtala Municipality covers an area of 44.18 km^{2} (17.06 sq mi). It has jurisdiction over the entire city of Maheshtala. The municipality was established in 1993; 33 years ago. It is divided into 35 administrative wards. According to the 2022 municipal election, it is being controlled by the All India Trinamool Congress.

=== Police stations ===
Maheshtala and Rabindranagar police stations are located in the Maheshtala municipal area. Maheshtala police station covers an area of 53.137 km^{2} (20.516 sq mi) and Rabindranagar police station covers an area of 6 km^{2} (2.3 sq mi). Both the police stations have jurisdiction over parts of the Maheshtala Municipality, and the Thakurpukur Maheshtala CD block.

== Transport ==
Maheshtala is on the Budge Budge Trunk Road.

Santoshpur, Akra and Nangi railway stations are located nearby.

== Education ==
- Maheshtala College, established in 1971, is affiliated with the University of Calcutta. It offers honours courses in Bengali, English, Sanskrit, history, geography, political science, education, philosophy, computer science, mathematics and accountancy and general courses in arts, science and commerce.
- Techno International Batanagar, established in 2012, offers diploma, undergraduate and postgraduate degree courses in Engineering and Technology and other allied fields.
- Akra High Madrasha, established in 1915, is a higher secondary co-ed school located in Akra.
