= Gobindapur, Bhangar =

Gobindapur
- Census Town
- Location in West Bengal Location in India
- Coordinates: 22.5097°N 88.6169°E
- Country: India
- State: West Bengal
- District: South 24 Parganas
- CD block: Bhangar I

Area
  - Total: 2.23 km^{2} (0.86 sq mi)
- Elevation: 9 m (30 ft)

Population (2011)
  - Total: 9,763
  - Density: 4,380/km^{2} (11,300/sq mi)

Languages
  - Official: Bengali
  - Additional official: English
- Time zone: UTC+5:30 (IST)
- PIN: 743502
- Telephone code: +91 3218
- Vehicle registration: WB-19 to WB-22, WB-95 to WB-99
- Lok Sabha constituency: Jadavpur
- Vidhan Sabha constituency: Bhangar
- Website: www.s24pgs.gov.in

Gobindapur is a census town within the jurisdiction of the Bhangar police station in the Bhangar I CD block in the Baruipur subdivision of the South 24 Parganas district in the Indian state of West Bengal.

== Geography ==
Cities and towns in the northern part of Baruipur subdivision (including Sonarpur, Bhangar I & II CD blocks) in South 24 Parganas district
M: municipal city/ town, CT: census town, R: rural/ urban centre, N: neighbourhood
Owing to space constraints in the small map, the actual locations in a larger map may vary slightly

=== Area overview ===
Baruipur subdivision is a rural subdivision with moderate levels of urbanization. 31.05% of the population lives in the urban areas and 68.95% lives in the rural areas. In the northern portion of the subdivision (shown in the map alongside) there are 10 census towns. The entire district is situated in the Ganges Delta and the northern part of the subdivision is a flat plain bordering the metropolis of Kolkata.

Note: The map alongside presents some of the notable locations in the subdivision. All places marked in the map are linked in the larger full screen map.

=== Location ===
Gobindapur is located at 22°30′35″N 88°37′01″E. It has an average elevation of 9 metres (30 ft).

== Demographics ==
According to the 2011 Census of India, Gobindapur had a total population of 9,763, of which 4,992 (51%) were males and 4,771 (49%) were females. There were 1,452 persons in the age range of 0 to 6 years. The total number of literate persons in Gobindapur was 5,980 (71.95% of the population over 6 years).

== Civic administration ==
=== CD block HQ ===
The headquarters of the Bhangar I CD block are located at Gobindapur.

== Infrastructure ==
According to the District Census Handbook 2011, Gobindapur covered an area of 2.2323 km^{2}. Among the civic amenities, the protected water supply involved overhead tank and service reservoir. It had 789 domestic electric connections. Among the medical facilities, it had a dispensary/ health centre. Among the educational facilities it had were 1 primary school, 1 secondary school, 1 senior secondary school, the nearest general degree college at Bhangar Raghunathpur 1 km away. Among the commodities it produced were: leather bags and embroidery products.

== Transport ==
Gobindapur is on the State Highway 3.

== Healthcare ==
Nalmuri Rural Hospital, with 30 beds, at Nalmuri, is the major government medical facility in the Bhangar I CD block.
