= Balihati =

- Census Town
- Location in West Bengal, India Balihati (India)
- Coordinates: 22.512453°N 88.751556°E
- Country: India
- State: West Bengal
- District: North 24 Parganas

Area
  - Total: 3.1197 km^{2} (1.2045 sq mi)

Population (2011)
  - Total: 3,637
  - Density: 1,166/km^{2} (3,019/sq mi)

Languages
  - Official: Bengali, English
- Time zone: UTC+5:30 (IST)
- PIN: 743441
- Telephone code: 03174
- Vehicle registration: WB-23, WB-24, WB-25, WB-26
- Lok Sabha constituency: Basirhat
- Vidhan Sabha constituency: Minakhan

Balihati is a census town in the Minakhan CD block in the Basirhat subdivision of the North 24 Parganas district in the state of West Bengal, India.

== Geography ==
Cities, towns and locations in Basirhat subdivision, North 24 Parganas district
M: municipal town, CT: census town, R: rural/ urban centre
Owing to space constraints in the small map, the actual locations in a larger map may vary slightly

=== Location ===
Balihati is located at 22.512453°N 88.751556°E.

=== Area overview ===
The area shown in the map is a part of the Ichhamati-Raimangal Plain, located in the lower Ganges Delta. It contains soil of mature black or brownish loam to recent alluvium. Numerous rivers, creeks and khals criss-cross the area. The tip of the Sundarbans National Park is visible in the lower part of the map (shown in green but not marked). The larger full screen map shows the full forest area. A large section of the area is a part of the Sundarbans settlements. The densely populated area is an overwhelmingly rural area. Only 12.96% of the population lives in the urban areas and 87.04% of the population lives in the rural areas.

Note: The map alongside presents some of the notable locations in the subdivision. All places marked in the map are linked in the larger full screen map.

== Demographics ==
According to the 2011 Census of India, Balihati had a total population of 3,637, of which 1,890 (52%) were males and 1,747 (48%) were females. Population in the age range 0–6 years was 504. The total number of literate persons in Balihati was 2,239 (71.47% of the population over 6 years).

== Infrastructure ==
According to the District Census Handbook, North Twenty Four Parganas, 2011, Balihati covered an area of 4.1197 km^{2}. It had 331 domestic electric connections. Among the medical facilities it had 6 medicine shops. Among the educational facilities, it had 2 primary schools, 1 middle school, secondary, senior secondary schools at Joygaon 3 km away. The nearest college was 5 km away at Bamanpukuria.
