= Satgachhia =

- Village
- Location in West Bengal Location in India
- Coordinates: 22.4056°N 88.1816°E
- Country: India
- State: West Bengal
- District: South 24 Parganas
- CD block: Budge Budge II

Area
  - Total: 0.86 km^{2} (0.33 sq mi)
- Elevation: 9 m (30 ft)

Population (2011)
  - Total: 2,129
  - Density: 2,500/km^{2} (6,400/sq mi)

Languages
  - Official: Bengali
  - Additional official: English
- Time zone: UTC+5:30 (IST)
- PIN: 743318
- Telephone code: +91 33
- Vehicle registration: WB-19 to WB-22, WB-95 to WB-99
- Lok Sabha constituency: Diamond Harbour
- Vidhan Sabha constituency: Satgachhia
- Website: www.s24pgs.gov.in

Satgachhia is a village and a gram panchayat within the jurisdiction of the Nodakhali police station in the Budge Budge II CD block in the Alipore Sadar subdivision of the South 24 Parganas district in the Indian state of West Bengal.

== Geography ==
Satgachhia is located at 22°24′20″N 88°10′54″E. It has an average elevation of 9 metres (30 ft).

== Demographics ==
According to the 2011 Census of India, Satgachhia had a total population of 2,129.

== Transport ==
A short stretch of local roads link Satgachhia to the Budge Budge Trunk Road.

Budge Budge railway station is located nearby.

== Healthcare ==
Lakshmibala Dutta Rural Hospital, with 30 beds, at Bakrahat, is the major government medical facility in the Budge Budge II CD block.
