= Dakshin Raypur =

- Census Town
- Location in West Bengal Location in India
- Coordinates: 22.4043°N 88.1512°E
- Country: India
- State: West Bengal
- District: South 24 Parganas
- CD block: Budge Budge II

Area
  - Total: 4.42 km^{2} (1.71 sq mi)
- Elevation: 9 m (30 ft)

Population (2011)
  - Total: 14,076
  - Density: 3,180/km^{2} (8,250/sq mi)

Languages
  - Official: Bengali
  - Additional official: English
- Time zone: UTC+5:30 (IST)
- PIN: 743318
- Telephone code: +91 33
- Vehicle registration: WB-19 to WB-22, WB-95 to WB-99
- Lok Sabha constituency: Diamond Harbour
- Vidhan Sabha constituency: Budge Budge
- Website: www.s24pgs.gov.in

Dakshin Raypur is a census town within the jurisdiction of the Nodakhali police station in the Budge Budge II CD block in the Alipore Sadar subdivision of the South 24 Parganas district in the Indian state of West Bengal.

== Geography ==
Cities and towns in the western part of Alipore Sadar subdivision (including Budge Budge I & II, Thakurpukur Maheshtala CD blocks) in South 24 Parganas district
M: municipal city/ town, CT: census town, R: rural/ urban centre,
Owing to space constraints in the small map, the actual locations in a larger map may vary slightly
Bakrahat is in Bishnupur II CD block, but Lakshmibala Rural Hospital at Bakrahat serves Budge Budge II CD block and so it is included here.

=== Area overview ===
Alipore Sadar subdivision is the most urbanized part of the South 24 Parganas district. 59.85% of the population lives in urban areas and 40.15% lives in the rural areas. In the northern portion of the subdivision (shown in the map alongside) there are 21 census towns. The entire district is situated in the Ganges Delta and the subdivision, on the east bank of the Hooghly River, is an alluvial stretch, with industrial development.

Note: The map alongside presents some of the notable locations in the subdivision. All places marked in the map are linked in the larger full screen map.

=== Location ===
Dakshin Raypur is located at 22°24′15″N 88°09′04″E. It has an average elevation of 9 metres (30 ft).

Bowali, Chak Kashipur, Chak Alampur, Dakshin Raypur and Poali form a cluster of census towns, as per the map of the Budge Budge II CD block on page 181 of the District Census Handbook 2011 for the South 24 Parganas.

== Demographics ==
According to the 2011 Census of India, Dakshin Raypur had a total population of 14,076, of which 7,245 (51%) were males and 6,831 (49%) were females. There were 1,488 people in the age range of 0 to 6 years. The total number of literate people was 9,608 (76.33% of the population over 6 years).

== Infrastructure ==
According to the District Census Handbook 2011, Dakshin Raypur covered an area of 4.422 km^{2}. Among the civic amenities, the water supply involved over-head tank. It had 1,341 domestic electric connections. Among the educational facilities it had were 7 primary schools and 1 secondary school. Three important commodities it produced were papad, pottery and zari wok.

== Economy ==
=== Tourism ===
There is a three-storeyed Bhagirathi Inspection Bungalow of the Public Health Engineering Department built in 2003, initially for departmental people visiting the place in connection with work in the nearby water-treatment plant, but later partially open to the general public, with advance reservation from 33 & 33/1 Chetla Central Road, Kolkata. The first floor balcony has a view of the Hooghly.

== Transport ==
A short stretch of local roads link Dakshin Raypur to the Budge Budge Trunk Road.

Budge Budge railway station is located nearby.

== Education ==
Raipur Sri Sri Ramakrishna Amrita Vidyalaya is a Bengali-medium coeducational institution established in 1926. It has facilities for teaching from class VI to class XII.

== Healthcare ==
Lakshmibala Dutta Rural Hospital, with 30 beds, at Bakrahat, is the major government medical facility in the Budge Budge II CD block.
