= Jharkhali =

- Village
- Location in West Bengal Location in India
- Coordinates: 22.0263°N 88.6868°E
- Country: India
- State: West Bengal
- District: South 24 Parganas
- CD block: Basanti
- Elevation: 6 m (20 ft)

Languages
  - Official: Bengali
  - Additional official: English
- Time zone: UTC+5:30 (IST)
- PIN: 743312
- Telephone code: +91 3218
- Vehicle registration: WB-19 to WB-22, WB-95 to WB-99
- Lok Sabha constituency: Jaynagar (SC)
- Vidhan Sabha constituency: Basanti (SC)
- Website: www.s24pgs.gov.in

Jharkhali is a village and a gram panchayat within the jurisdiction of the Basanti police station in the Basanti CD block in the Canning subdivision of the South 24 Parganas district in the Indian state of West Bengal.

== Geography ==
Places in Canning subdivision (Canning I & II, Basanti, Gosaba CD blocks) in South 24 Parganas district
R: rural/ urban centre
Places linked with coastal activity are marked in blue
Owing to space constraints in the small map, the actual locations in a larger map may vary slightly

=== Area overview ===
Canning subdivision has a very low level of urbanization. Only 12.37% of the population lives in the urban areas and 87.63% lives in the rural areas. There are 8 census towns in Canning I CD block and only 2 in the rest of the subdivision. The entire district is situated in the Ganges Delta with numerous islands in the southern part of the region. The area (shown in the map alongside) borders on the Sundarbans National Park and a major portion of it is a part of the Sundarbans settlements. It is a flat low-lying area in the South Bidyadhari plains. The Matla River is prominent and there are many streams and water channels locally known as khals. A comparatively recent country-wide development is the guarding of the coastal areas with a special coastal force.

Note: The map alongside presents some of the notable locations in the subdivision. All places marked in the map are linked in the larger full screen map.

=== Location ===
Jharkhali is located at 21.0263°N 88.6868°E.

Jharkhali Coastal police station is marked in Google maps. The place is shown as Lot No. 126. In the map of the Basanti CD block on page 773 in the District Census Handbook for the South 24 Parganas the place is shown as close to Herobhanga Reserve Forest.

== Civic administration ==
=== Police station ===
Jharkhali Coastal police station was inaugurated on 30 October 2014. It covers an area of 52 km^{2}. It has jurisdiction over parts of the Basanti CD block. The coastal police stations were formed with the objective of effective policing of the remote areas of the Sundarbans. The police has regular river patrols.

== Transport ==
A stretch of a local road links Jharkhali to the State Highway 3 (locally popular as the Basanti Highway).

== Education ==
Herobhanga Vidyasagar Vidyamandir is a Bengali-medium coeducational institution established in 1959. The school has facilities for teaching from class V to class XII. The school has a library with 800 books and a play ground.

Tridibnagar Janakalyan Junior High School is a Bengali-medium coeducational institution established in 2011. It has facilities for teaching from class V to class XII.

== Healthcare ==
There is a primary health centre at Herobhanga-Jharkhali (PO Jharkhali Bazar) (with 6 beds).
