= Bawali =

- Census Town
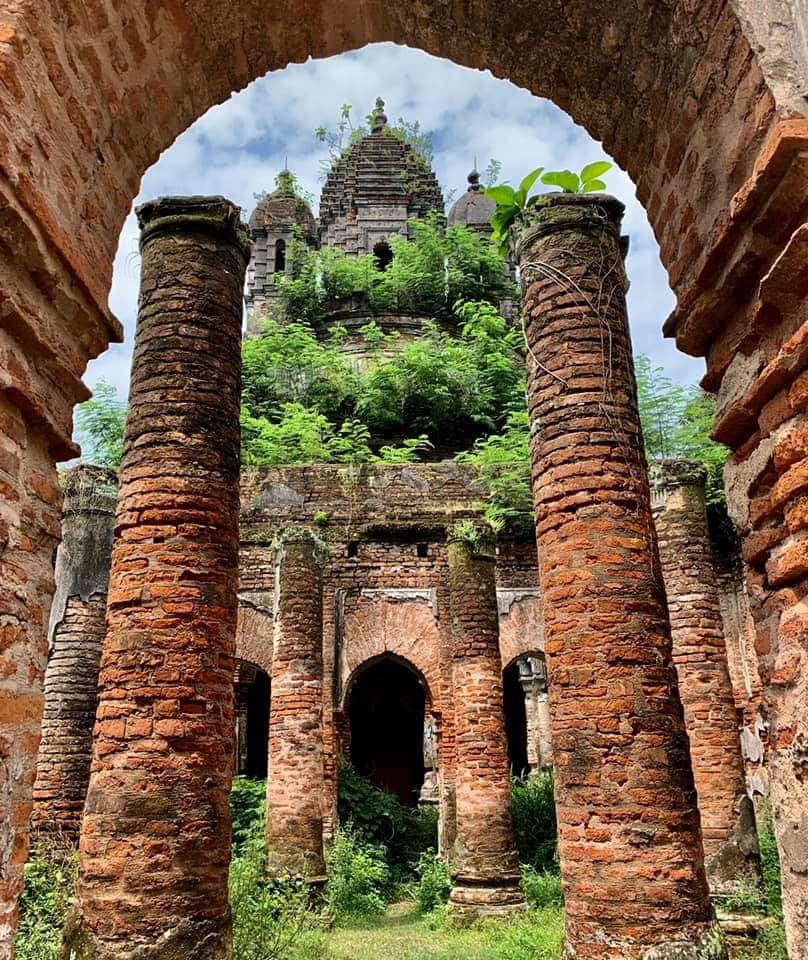
- Ruins of Gopinath Jiu Temple

- Location in West Bengal Location in India
- Coordinates: 22.4041°N 88.1852°E
- Country: India
- State: West Bengal
- District: South 24 Parganas
- CD block: Budge Budge II

Area
  - Total: 3.62 km^{2} (1.40 sq mi)
- Elevation: 9 m (30 ft)

Population (2011)
  - Total: 10,968
  - Density: 3,030/km^{2} (7,850/sq mi)

Languages
  - Official: Bengali
  - Additional official: English
- Time zone: UTC+5:30 (IST)
- PIN: 700137
- Telephone code: +91 33
- Vehicle registration: WB-19 to WB-22, WB-95 to WB-99
- Lok Sabha constituency: Diamond Harbour
- Vidhan Sabha constituency: Budge Budge
- Website: www.s24pgs.gov.in

Bawali is a census town within the jurisdiction of the Nodakhali police station in the Budge Budge II CD block in the Alipore Sadar subdivision of the South 24 Parganas district in the Indian state of West Bengal.

== History ==
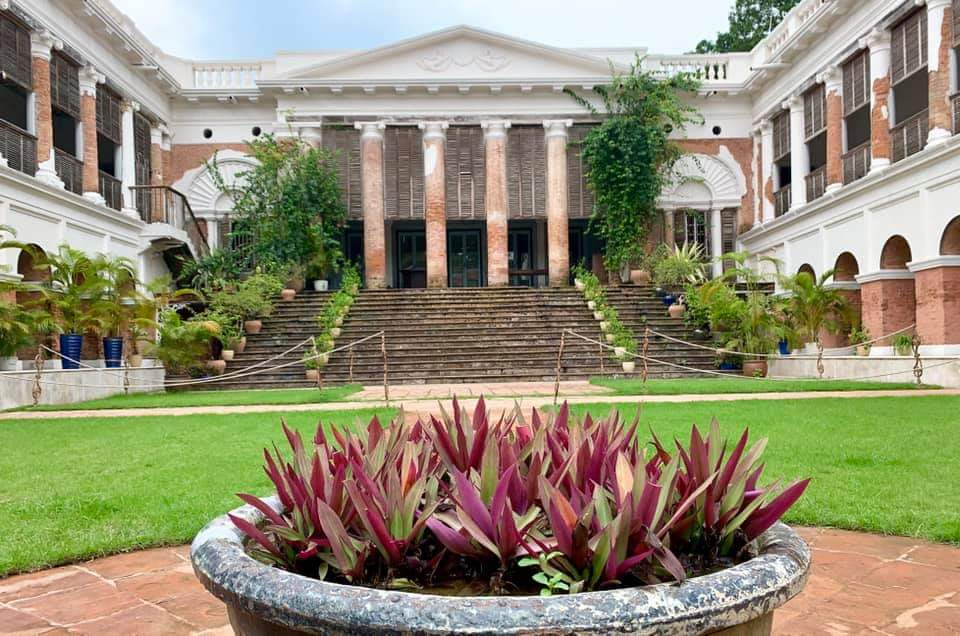
Façade of the 300-year old Bawali Rajbari, with corinthian pillars – has been renovated for use as a hotel.

During the Mughal Period, the vaishnavite wealthy Mondals of the Mahishya community, who hailed from Nadia, established the Bawali Raj, in this area adjacent to Sundarbans. Originally Roys, Shovaram, the grandson of Basudev Roy (who lived between the end of 16th century and the early 17th century), was awarded the title—Mondal. Shovaram’s grandson, Rajaram, was a commander-in-chief (senapati) in Mughal army and suppressed a peasant revolt, and as a reward for his bravery, the Raja granted him ownership of 50 villages that included Bawali and Budge Budge. Rajaram’s grandson Haradhan, who became a trading partner of the East India Company, and his sons built many temples in Bawali turning the nondescript villages into a "temple town". At the invite of Robert Clive, some members of Mondal family moved to Tollygunge, Calcutta. They built houses and temples including a part of Kalighat Kali Temple and also the Choto Rasbari by the side of Adi Ganga. Mondals had matrimonial relationship with Rani Rashmoni's family and historians suggest that the architectural style of Rani Rashmoni's Dakshineswar Kali Temple was inspired by the Navaratna style of Radhakanta temples of Mondal family.

== Geography ==
Cities and towns in the western part of Alipore Sadar subdivision (including Budge Budge I & II, Thakurpukur Maheshtala CD blocks) in South 24 Parganas district
M: municipal city/ town, CT: census town, R: rural/ urban centre,
Owing to space constraints in the small map, the actual locations in a larger map may vary slightly
Bakrahat is in Bishnupur II CD block, but Lakshmibala Rural Hospital at Bakrahat serves Budge Budge II CD block and so it is included here.

=== Area overview ===
Alipore Sadar subdivision is the most urbanized part of the South 24 Parganas district. 59.85% of the population lives in the urban areas and 40.15% lives in the rural areas. In the northern portion of the subdivision (shown in the map alongside) there are 21 census towns. The entire district is situated in the Ganges Delta and the subdivision, on the east bank of the Hooghly River, is an alluvial stretch, with industrial development.

Note: The map alongside presents some of the notable locations in the subdivision. All places marked in the map are linked in the larger full screen map.

=== Location ===
Bawali is located at 22°24′15″N 88°11′07″E. It has an average elevation of 9 metres (30 ft).

Bawali, Chak Kashipur, Chak Alampur, Dakshin Raypur and Poali form a cluster of census towns, as per the map of the Budge Budge II CD block on page 181 of the District Census Handbook 2011 for the South 24 Parganas.

== Demographics ==
According to the 2011 Census of India, Bawali had a total population of 10,968, of which 5,709 (52%) were males and 5,259 (48%) were females. There were 894 people in the age range of 0 to 6 years. The total number of literate people was 8,694 (86.30% of the population over 6 years).

According to the 2001 Census of India, Bawali had a population of 10,200. Males constitute 53% of the population and females 47%. It has an average literacy rate of 76%, higher than the national average of 59.5%; with male literacy of 83% and female literacy of 69%. 9% of the population is under 6 years of age.

== Infrastructure ==
According to the District Census Handbook 2011, Bawali covered an area of 3.62 km^{2}. Among the civic amenities, the water supply involved over-head tank. It had 2,235 domestic electric connections. Among the educational facilities it had were 5 primary schools, 2 middle schools and 2 secondary schools.

== Economy ==
=== Tourism ===
There are two luxury hotels at Bowaii – The Rajbari Bawali and Farmhouse.

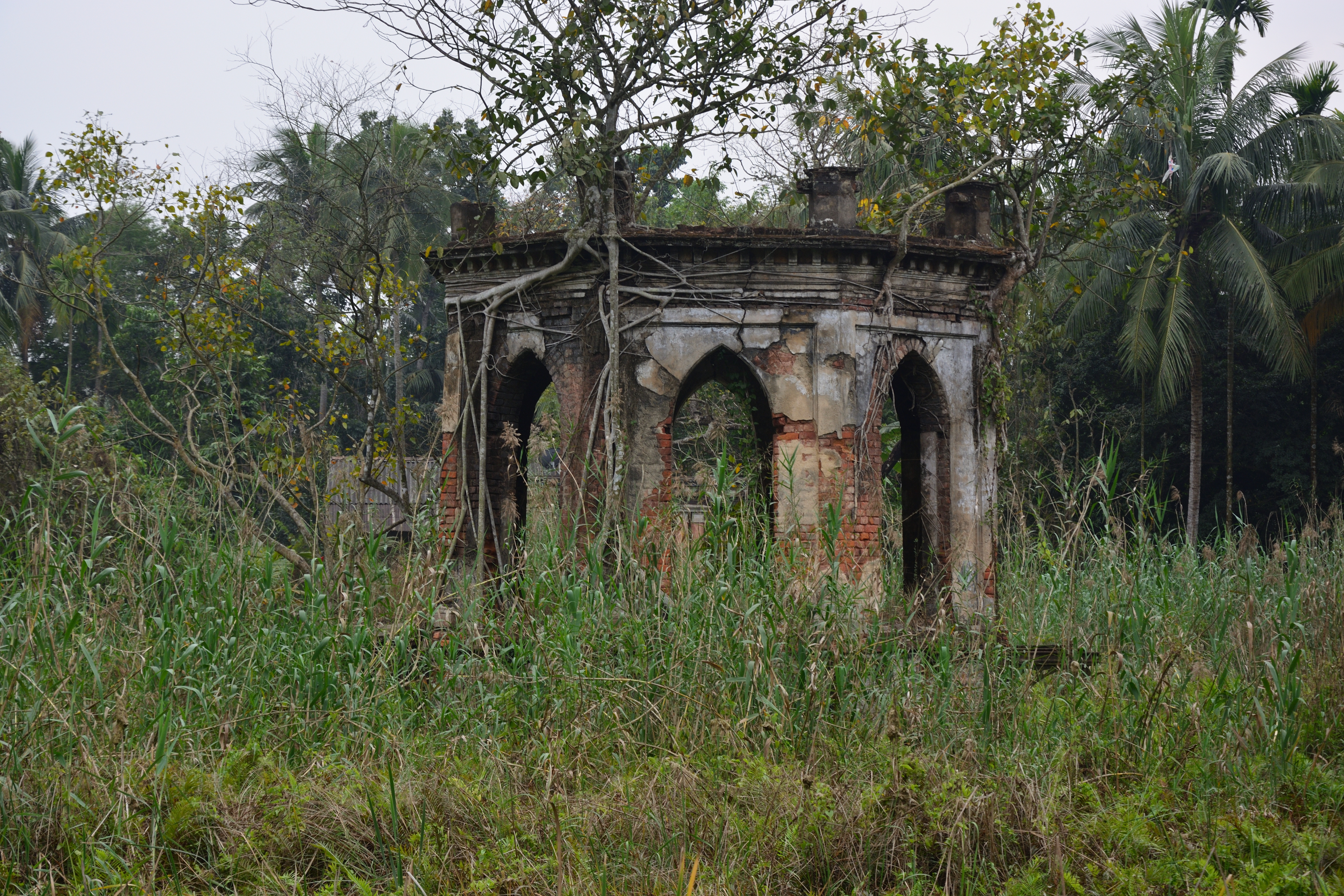
Jaltungi(water folly) used by the zamindars of Bawali

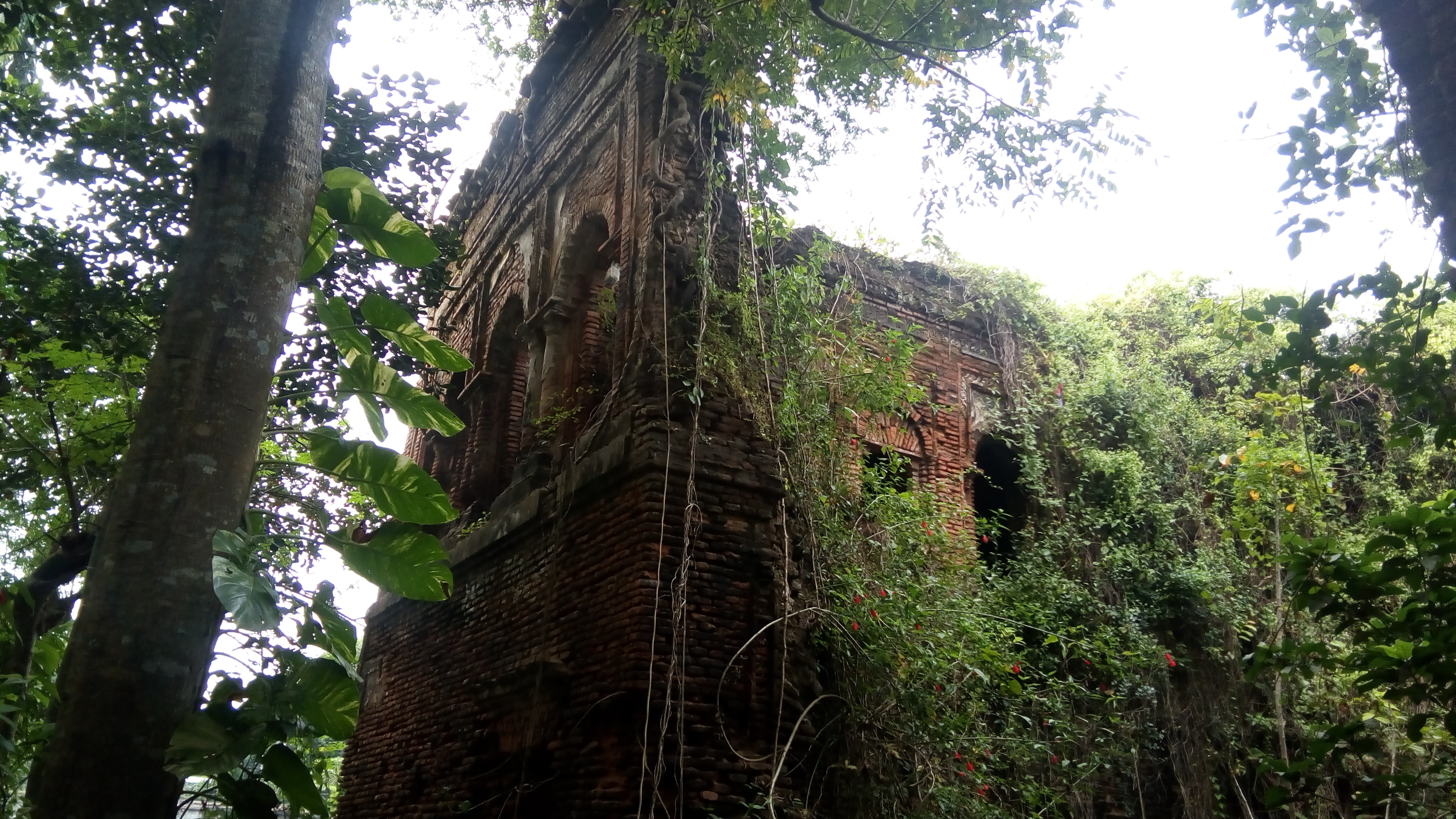
Ruins of Mondal villa

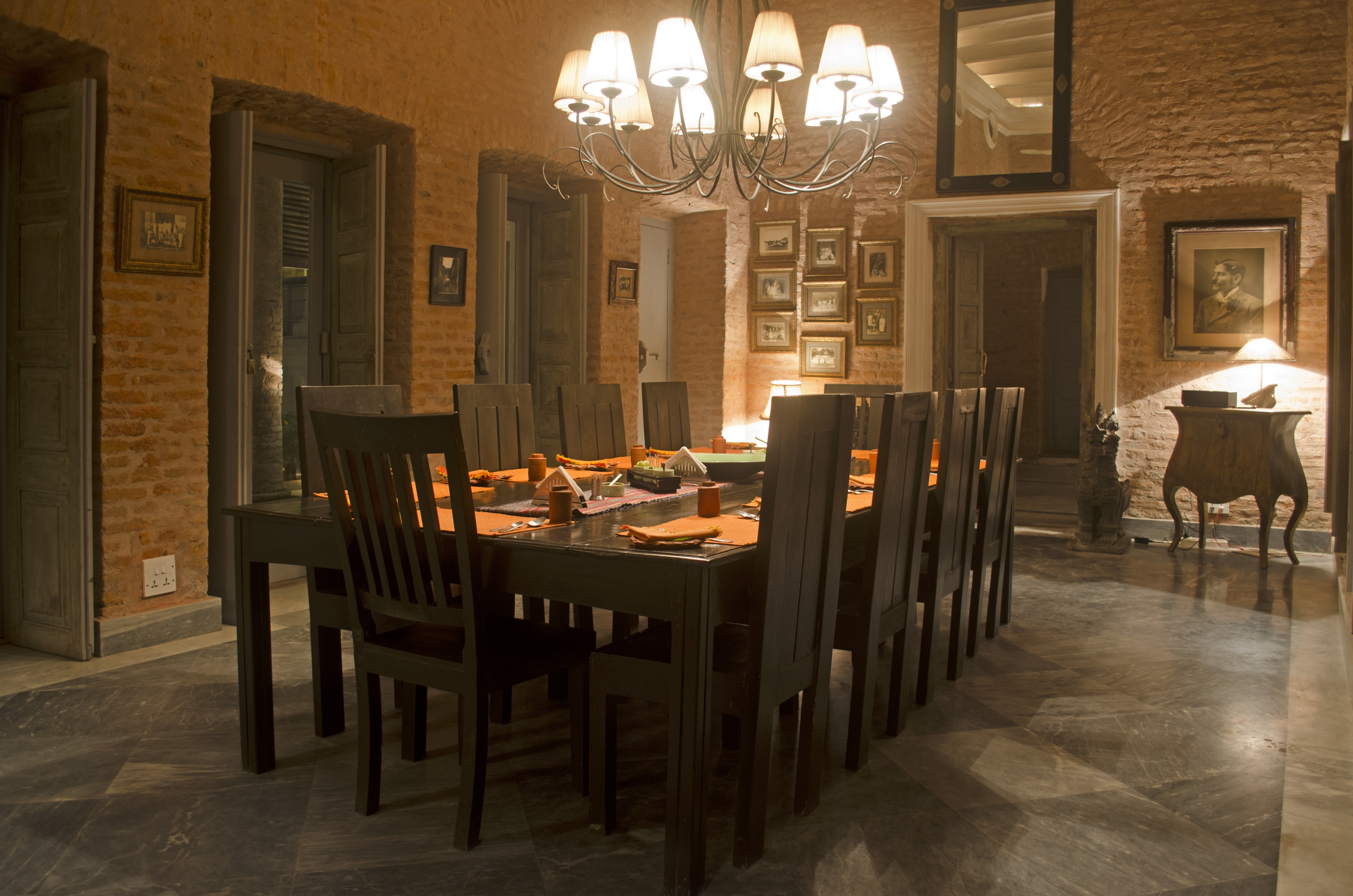
Inside view of luxury heritage hotel - The Rajbari Bawali

== Transport ==
A short stretch of local roads link Bawali to the Budge Budge Trunk Road.

Budge Budge railway station is located nearby.

== Education ==
Bawali High School is a Bengali-medium coeducational institution, established in 1899. It has arrangements for teaching from class V to class XII.

Bawali Pallimongal High School is a Bengali-medium coeducational institution established in 1974. It has facilities for teaching from class VI to class XII.

== Healthcare ==
Lakshmibala Dutta Rural Hospital, with 30 beds, at Bakrahat, is the major government medical facility in the Budge Budge II CD block.

== See also ==
- Bawali Raj
