= Chak Alampur =

- Census Town
- Location in West Bengal Location in India
- Coordinates: 22.4161°N 88.1655°E
- Country: India
- State: West Bengal
- District: South 24 Parganas
- CD block: Budge Budge II

Area
  - Total: 3.26 km^{2} (1.26 sq mi)
- Elevation: 9 m (30 ft)

Population (2011)
  - Total: 11,144
  - Density: 3,420/km^{2} (8,850/sq mi)

Languages
  - Official: Bengali
  - Additional official: English
- Time zone: UTC+5:30 (IST)
- PIN: 743318
- Telephone code: +91 33
- Vehicle registration: WB-19 to WB-22, WB-95 to WB-99
- Lok Sabha constituency: Diamond Harbour
- Vidhan Sabha constituency: Budge Budge
- Website: www.s24pgs.gov.in

Chak Alampur is a census town within the jurisdiction of the Nodakhali police station in the Budge Budge II CD block in the Alipore Sadar subdivision of the South 24 Parganas district in the Indian state of West Bengal.

== Geography ==
Cities and towns in the western part of Alipore Sadar subdivision (including Budge Budge I & II, Thakurpukur Maheshtala CD blocks) in South 24 Parganas district
M: municipal city/ town, CT: census town, R: rural/ urban centre,
Owing to space constraints in the small map, the actual locations in a larger map may vary slightly
Bakrahat is in Bishnupur II CD block, but Lakshmibala Rural Hospital at Bakrahat serves Budge Budge II CD block and so it is included here.

=== Area overview ===
Alipore Sadar subdivision is the most urbanized part of the South 24 Parganas district. 59.85% of the population lives in the urban areas and 40.15% lives in the rural areas. In the northern portion of the subdivision (shown in the map alongside) there are 21 census towns. The entire district is situated in the Ganges Delta and the subdivision, on the east bank of the Hooghly River, is an alluvial stretch, with industrial development.

Note: The map alongside presents some of the notable locations in the subdivision. All places marked in the map are linked in the larger full screen map.

=== Location ===
Chak Alampur is located at 22°24′58″N 88°09′56″E. It has an average elevation of 9 metres (30 ft).

Bowali, Chak Kashipur, Chak Alampur, Dakshin Raypur and Poali form a cluster of census towns, as per map of Budge Budge II CD block on page 181 of District Census Handbook 2011 for South 24 Parganas.

== Demographics ==
According to the 2011 Census of India, Chak Alampur had a total population of 11,144, of which 5,662 (51%) were males and 5,5482 (49%) were females. There were 1,303 people in the age range of 0 to 6 years. The total number of literate people was 7,727 (78.52% of the population over 6 years).

== Infrastructure ==
According to the District Census Handbook 2011, Chak Alampur covered an area of 3.2575 km^{2}. Budge Budge railway station is 9 km away. Among the civic amenities it had 40 km roads with open drains. The water supply involved over-head tank. It had 1,325 domestic electric connections. Among the educational facilities it had were 4 primary schools, 1 secondary school, the nearest senior secondary school was at Husnecha 2 km away. The nearest general degree college was at Budge Budge 9 km away. It had 3 non-formal education centres (Sarba Siksha Abhiyan). Three important commodities it manufactured were foodgrains, textile products and coal.

== Transport ==
A short stretch of local roads link Chak Alampur to the Budge Budge Trunk Road.

Budge Budge railway station is located nearby.

== Education ==
Alampur Siksha Niketan is a Bengali-medium coeducational institution established in 1975. It has facilities for teaching from class V to class X.

Hasnecha High School is a Bengali-medium coeducational institution established in 1964. It has arrangements for teaching from class V to class XII.

== Healthcare ==
Lakshmibala Dutta Rural Hospital, with 30 beds, at Bakrahat, is the major government medical facility in the Budge Budge II CD block.
