= Bamanpukuria =

Bamanpukuria Bamanpukur
- Village
- Location in West Bengal, India Bamanpukuria (India)
- Coordinates: 22.513472°N 88.698632°E
- Country: India
- State: West Bengal
- District: North 24 Parganas

Population (2011)
  - Total: 6,421

Languages
  - Official: Bengali, English
- Time zone: UTC+5:30 (IST)
- PIN: 743425 (Bamanpukur)
- Telephone/STD code: 03217
- Lok Sabha constituency: Basirhat
- Vidhan Sabha constituency: Minakhan
- Website: north24parganas.nic.in

Bamanpukuria (also known as Bamanpukur) is a village and a gram panchayat in the Minakhan CD block in the Basirhat subdivision of the North 24 Parganas district in the state of West Bengal, India.

== Geography ==
Cities, towns and locations in Basirhat subdivision, North 24 Parganas district
M: municipal town, CT: census town, R: rural/ urban centre
Owing to space constraints in the small map, the actual locations in a larger map may vary slightly

=== Location ===
Bamanpukuria is located at 22.513472°N 88.698632°E.

=== Overview ===
The area shown in the map is a part of the Ichhamati-Raimangal Plain, located in the lower Ganges Delta. It contains soil of mature black or brownish loam to recent alluvium. Numerous rivers, creeks and khals criss-cross the area. The tip of the Sundarbans National Park is visible in the lower part of the map (shown in green but not marked). The larger full screen map shows the full forest area. A large section of the area is a part of the Sundarbans settlements. The densely populated area is an overwhelmingly rural area. Only 12.96% of the population lives in the urban areas and 87.04% of the population lives in the rural areas.

Note: The map alongside presents some of the notable locations in the subdivision. All places marked in the map are linked in the larger full screen map.

== Demographics ==
According to the 2011 Census of India, Bamanpukuria had a total population of 6,421, of which 3,320 (52%) were males and 3,101 (48%) were females. Population in the age range 0–6 years was 728. The total number of literate persons in Bamanpukurial was 4,017 (70.56% of the population over 6 years).

== Transport ==
State Highway 3 (locally known as Kolkata Malancha Road/ Basanti Highway) passes through Bamanpukuria.

== Education ==
Bamanpukur Humayun Kabir Mahavidyalaya was established at Bamanpukuria in 2007. Affiliated to the West Bengal State University, it offers honours courses in Bengali, English, Sanskrit, history, political science and education, and a general course in arts.

Bamanpukuria S.M.M. High School is a Bengali-medium co-educational school established in 1954. It has facilities for teaching from class VI to class XII. The school has 15 computers, a library and a play ground.

== Healthcare ==
Minakhan Rural Hospital at Minakhan is located nearby.
