= Budge Budge II =

Community Development Block in West Bengal, India

- Community Development Block
- Location of Budge Budge II community development block in South 24 Parganas district
- Coordinates: 22.4827548°N 88.1817594°E
- Country: India
- State: West Bengal
- Division: Presidency
- District: South 24 Parganas
- Subdivision: Alipore Sadar
- Headquarters: Dongaria

Government
  - Gram Panchayats: Burul, Chakmanik, Dongaria Raipur, Gaja Poyali, Kamrabad, Kasipur Alampur, Naskarpur, North Bawali, Rania, Satgachhia, South Bawali
  - Lok Sabha constituencies: Diamond Harbour
  - Vidhan Sabha constituencies: Satgachhia, Budge Budge

Area
  - Total: 78.00 km^{2} (30.12 sq mi)

Population (2011)
  - Total: 192,134
  - Density: 2,463/km^{2} (6,380/sq mi)
  - Urban: 56,880

Demographics
  - Literacy: 79.13 per cent
  - Sex ratio: 949 ♂/♀

Languages
  - Official: Bengali
  - Additional official: English
- Time zone: UTC+05:30 (IST)
- Website: s24pgs.gov.in

Budge Budge II is a community development block that forms an administrative division in Alipore Sadar subdivision of South 24 Parganas district in the Indian state of West Bengal.

== Geography ==

The Budge Budge II CD block is located at 22°28′58″N 88°10′54″E. It has an average elevation of 9 metres (30 ft).

The Budge Budge II CD block is bounded by the Budge Budge I CD block and the Sankrail CD block in the Howrah district, across the Hooghly, in the north, the Bishnupur II CD block in the east, the Falta CD block in the south, the Sankrail and Uluberia I CD blocks in the Howrah district, across the Hooghly, in the west.

The South 24 Parganas district is divided into two distinct physiographic zones: the marine-riverine delta in the north and the marine delta zone in the south. As the sea receded southwards, in the sub-recent geological period, a large low-lying plain got exposed. Both tidal inflows and the rivers have been depositing sediments in this plain. The periodical collapse of both the natural levees and man-made embankments speed up the process of filling up of the depressions containing brackish water wetlands. The marine delta in the south is formed of interlacing tidal channels. As non-saline water for irrigation is scarce, agriculture is monsoon dominated. Some parts of the wetlands are still preserved for raising fish.

The Budge Budge II CD block has an area of 78.00 km^{2}. It has 1 panchayat samity, 11 gram panchayats, 150 gram sansads (village councils), 64 mouzas and 61 inhabited villages, as per the District Statistical Handbook for South Twenty-four Parganas. Nodakhali police station serves this CD Block. Headquarters of this CD block is at Dongaria.

Gram panchayats of the Budge Budge II CD block/panchayat samiti are: Burul, Chakmanik, Dongaria Raipur, Gaja Poyali, Kamrabad, Kasipur Alampur, Naskarpur, North Bawali, Rania, Satgachhia and South Bawali.

== Demographics ==
=== Population ===
According to the 2011 Census of India, the Budge Budge II CD block had a total population of 192,134, of which 135,254 were rural and 56,880 were urban. There were 98,570 (51%) males and 93,564 (49%) females. There were 20,985 persons in the age range of 0 to 6 years. The Scheduled Castes numbered 38,495 (20.04%) and the Scheduled Tribes numbered 262 (0.14%).

According to the 2001 Census of India, Budge Budge II CD block had a total population of 173,467, out of which 90,001 were males and 83,466 were females. The Budge Budge II CD block registered a population growth of 15.23 per cent during the 1991-2001 decade. Decadal growth for South 24 Parganas district was 20.89 per cent. Decadal growth in West Bengal was 17.84 per cent. Scheduled Castes at 38,059 formed around one-fourth the population. The Scheduled Tribes numbered 1,423.

Census Towns in the Budge Budge II CD block (2011 census figures in brackets): Chak Kashipur (12,035), Chak Alampur (11,144), Bowali (10,968), Dakshin Raypur (14,076) and Poali (8,657).

Large villages (with 4,000+ population) in the Budge Budge II CD block (2011 census figures in brackets): Chandipur (9,066), Muchisha (4,023), Dongaria (7,425), Baratala (4,595), Telari (4,937) and Burul (7,014).

Other villages in the Budge Budge II CD block include (2011 census figures in brackets): Chakmanik (2903), Gaja (3,924), Rania Gobindpur (1,366), Kamra (1,500), Laskarpur (2,495) and Satgachhia (2,129).

=== Literacy ===
According to the 2011 census, the total number of literate persons in the Budge Budge II CD block was 135,428 (79.13% of the population over 6 years) out of which males numbered 73,573 (83.75% of the male population over 6 years) and females numbered 61,855 (74.26% of the female population over 6 years). The gender disparity (the difference between female and male literacy rates) was 9.49%.

According to the 2011 Census of India, literacy in the South 24 Parganas district was 77.51 Literacy in West Bengal was 77.08% in 2011. Literacy in India in 2011 was 74.04%.

According to the 2001 Census of India, the Budge Budge II CD block had a total literacy of 72.46 per cent for the 6+ age group. While male literacy was 80.24 per cent female literacy was 64.01 per cent. South 24 Parganas district had a total literacy of 69.45 per cent, male literacy being 79.19 per cent and female literacy being 59.01 per cent.

See also – List of West Bengal districts ranked by literacy rate

Literacy in CD blocks of
South 24 Parganas district
Alipore Sadar subdivision
Bishnupur I – 78.33%
Bishnupur II – 81.37%
Budge Budge I – 80.57%
Budge Budge II – 79.13%
Thakurpukur Maheshtala – 83.54%
Baruipur subdivision
Baruipur – 76.46%
Bhangar I – 72.06%
Bhangar II – 74.49%
Jaynagar I – 73.17%
Jaynagar II – 69.71%
Kultali – 69.37%
Sonarpur – 79.70%
Canning subdivision
Basanti – 68.32%
Canning I – 70.76%
Canning II – 66.51%
Gosaba – 78.98%
Diamond Harbour subdivision
Diamond Harbour I – 75.72%
Diamond Harbour II – 76.91%
Falta – 77.17%
Kulpi – 75.49%
Magrahat I – 73.82%
Magrahat II – 77.41%
Mandirbazar – 75.89%
Mathurapur I – 73.93%
Mathurapur II – 77.77%
Kakdwip subdivision
Kakdwip – 77.93%
Namkhana – 85.72
Patharpratima – 82.11%
Sagar – 84.21%
Source: 2011 Census: CD Block Wise
Primary Census Abstract Data

=== Language ===
Languages of Budge Budge II CD block (2011)
1. Bengali (98.2%)
2. Hindi (1.79%)
3. Urdu (0.02%)
4. Others (0.01%)

At the time of the 2011 census, 98.18% of the population spoke Bengali, 1.79% Hindi and 0.02% Urdu as their first language.

=== Religion ===
Religion in Budge Budge II CD block (2011)
Hinduism	67.55%
Islam	32.23%
Other or not stated	0.22%

In the 2011 Census of India, Hindus numbered 129,778 and formed 67.55% of the population in Budge Budge II CD block. Muslims numbered 61,934 and formed 32.23% of the population. Others numbered 422 and formed 0.22% of the population. In 2001, Hindus and Muslims were 70.38% and 29.57% of the population respectively.

The proportion of Hindus in South Twenty-four Parganas district has declined from 76.0% in 1961 to 63.2% in 2011. The proportion of Muslims in South Twenty-four Parganas district has increased from 23.4% to 35.6% during the same period. Christians formed 0.8% in 2011.

== Rural poverty ==
According to the Human Development Report for the South 24 Parganas district, published in 2009, in the Budge Budge II CD block the percentage of households below poverty line was 34.04%. In the north-west portion of the district, the Sonarpur CD block followed Budge Budge II CD block with a poverty ratio of 23.36, all other CD blocks had poverty ratio below 20%. As per rural household survey in 2005, the proportion of households in the South 24 Parganas with poverty rates below poverty line was 34.11%, way above the state and national poverty ratios. The poverty rates were very high in the Sundarbans settlements with all thirteen CD blocks registering poverty ratios above 30% and eight CD blocks had more than 40% of the population in the BPL category.

== Economy ==
=== Livelihood ===
Livelihood
in Budge Budge II CD block
1. Cultivators (5.60%)
2. Agricultural labourers (23.1%)
3. Household industries (13.1%)
4. Other Workers (58.1%)

In Budge Budge II CD block in 2011, among the class of total workers, cultivators numbered 3,896 and formed 5.60%, agricultural labourers numbered 16,068 and formed 23.11%, household industry workers numbered 9,136 and formed 13.14% and other workers numbered 40,442 and formed 58.15%. Total workers numbered 69,542 and formed 36.19% of the total population, and non-workers numbered 122,592 and formed 63.81% of the population.

The District Human Development Report points out that in the blocks of region situated in the close proximity of the Kolkata metropolis, overwhelming majority are involved in the non-agricultural sector for their livelihood. On the other hand, in the Sundarbans settlements, overwhelming majority are dependent on agriculture. In the intermediate region, there is again predominance of the non-agricultural sector. Though the region is not very close to Kolkata, many places are well connected and some industrial/ economic development has taken place.

Note: In the census records a person is considered a cultivator, if the person is engaged in cultivation/ supervision of land owned by self/government/institution. When a person who works on another person's land for wages in cash or kind or share, is regarded as an agricultural labourer. Household industry is defined as an industry conducted by one or more members of the family within the household or village, and one that does not qualify for registration as a factory under the Factories Act. Other workers are persons engaged in some economic activity other than cultivators, agricultural labourers and household workers. It includes factory, mining, plantation, transport and office workers, those engaged in business and commerce, teachers, entertainment artistes and so on.

=== Infrastructure ===
There are 61 inhabited villages in the Budge Budge II CD block, as per the District Census Handbook, South Twenty-four Parganas, 2011. 100% villages have power supply. 53 villages (86.89%) have drinking water supply. 17 villages (27.87%) have post offices. 58 villages (95.08%) have telephones (including landlines, public call offices and mobile phones). 28 villages (45.90%) have pucca (paved) approach roads and 28 villages (45.90%) have transport communication (includes bus service, rail facility and navigable waterways). 4 villages (6.56%) have banks.

=== Agriculture ===
The South 24 Parganas had played a significant role in the Tebhaga movement launched by the Communist Party of India in 1946. Subsequently, Operation Barga was aimed at securing tenancy rights for the peasants. In the Budge Budge II CD block 61.97 acres of land was acquired and vested. Out of this 55.83 acres or 90.09% of the vested land was distributed. The total number of patta (document) holders was 548.

According to the District Human Development Report, agriculture is an important source of livelihood in the South Twentyfour Parganas district. The amount of cultivable land per agricultural worker is only 0.41 hectare in the district. Moreover, the irrigation facilities have not been extended to a satisfactory scale. Agriculture mostly remains a mono-cropped activity.

According to the District Census Handbook, the saline soil of the district is unfit for cultivation, but the non-salty lands are very fertile. While rice is the main food crop, jute is the main cash crop.

In 2013-14, there were 29 fertiliser depots, 24 seed stores and 44 fair price shops in the Budge Budge II CD block.

In 2013-14, the Budge Budge II CD block produced 7,312 tonnes of Aman paddy, the main winter crop from 3,984 hectares, 6,514 tonnes of Boro paddy (spring crop) from 2,167 hectares.

=== Pisciculture ===
In the Budge Budge II CD block, in 2013-14, net area under effective pisciculture was 1,161 hectares, engaging 11,964 persons in the profession, and with an approximate annual production of 57,832 quintals.

Pisciculture is an important source of employment in South 24 Parganas district. As of 2001, more than 4.5 lakh people were engaged in Pisciculture. Out of this 2.57 lakhs were from the 13 blocks in the Sundarbans settlements.

=== Banking ===
In 2013-14, the Budge Budge II CD block had offices of 8 commercial banks and 2 gramin banks.

=== Backward Regions Grant Fund ===
The South 24 Parganas district is listed as a backward region and receives financial support from the Backward Regions Grant Fund. The fund, created by the Government of India, is designed to redress regional imbalances in development. As of 2012, 272 districts across the country were listed under this scheme. The list includes 11 districts of West Bengal.

== Transport ==
The Budge Budge II CD block has 4 ferry services and 7 originating/ terminating bus routes. The nearest railway station is 14 km from the block headquarters.

== Education ==
In 2013-14, the Budge Budge II CD block had 93 primary schools with 7,945 students, 7 middle schools with 767 students, 10 high schools with 3,196 students and 14 higher secondary schools with 9,329 students. Budge Budge II CD block had 1 general degree college with 1,429 students and 250 institutions for special and non-formal education with 8,785 students.

See also – Education in India

According to the 2011 census, in the Budge Budge II CD block, among the 61 inhabited villages, 2 villages did not have a school, 28 villages had two or more primary schools, 23 villages had at least 1 primary and 1 middle school and 17 villages had at least 1 middle and 1 secondary school.

Saheed Anurup Chandra Mahavidyalaya was established at Burul in 1991.

== Healthcare ==
Certain areas of the South 24 Parganas district have been identified where ground water is affected by Arsenic Contamination. High levels of arsenic in ground water were found in twelve CD blocks of the district. Water samples collected from tubewells in the affected places contained arsenic above the normal level (10 micrograms per litre as specified by the World Health Organization). The affected CD blocks are Baruipur, Bhangar I, Bhangar II, Bishnupur I, Bishnupur II, Basanti, Budge Budge II, Canning I, Canning II, Sonarpur, Magrahat II and Jaynagar I.

In 2014, the Budge Budge II CD block had 1 rural hospital, 2 primary health centres and 4 private nursing homes with total 61 beds and 11 doctors (excluding private bodies). It had 24 family welfare subcentres. 2,666 patients were treated indoor and 108,199 patients were treated outdoor in the hospitals, health centres and subcentres of the CD block.

According to the 2011 census, in the Budge Budge II CD block, 1 village had a community health centre, 3 villages had primary health centres, 19 villages had primary health subcentres, 2 villages had maternity and child welfare centres, 1 village had a veterinary hospital, 16 villages had medicine shops and out of the 61 inhabited villages 10 villages had no medical facilities.

Lakshmibala Dutta Rural Hospital at Bakrahat with 30 beds is the major government medical facility in the Budge Budge II CD block. There are primary health centres at Burul (with 6 beds) and Gajapoali (PO Poali) (with 6 beds).
