= Minakhan =

- Community development block
- Interactive map of Minakhan
- Coordinates: 22.501°N 88.719°E
- Country: India
- State: West Bengal
- District: North 24 Parganas

Government
  - Type: Representative democracy

Area
  - Total: 158.82 km^{2} (61.32 sq mi)

Population (2011)
  - Total: 199,084
  - Density: 1,253.5/km^{2} (3,246.6/sq mi)

Languages
  - Official: Bengali, English

Literacy (2011)
  - Total literates: 122,283 (71.33%)
- Time zone: UTC+5:30 (IST)
- PIN: 743441 (Minakhan)
- Telephone/STD code: 03217
- ISO 3166 code: IN-WB
- Vehicle registration: WB-23, WB-24, WB-25, WB-26
- Lok Sabha constituency: Basirhat
- Vidhan Sabha constituency: Minakhan
- Website: north24parganas.nic.in

Minakhan is a community development block that forms an administrative division in Basirhat subdivision of North 24 Parganas district in the Indian state of West Bengal.

== Geography ==
Minakhan is located at 22°30′04″N 88°43′08″E.

Minakhan CD Block is bounded by Basirhat I CD Block in the north, Hasnabad and Sandeshkhali I CD Blocks in the east, Bhangar I and Bhangar II CD Blocks in South 24 Parganas district in the south and west, and Haroa CD Block in the west.

Minakhan CD Block is part of the North Bidyadhari Plain, one of the three physiographic regions in the district located in the lower Ganges Delta. The area is full of marshes and salt water lakes. The Bidyadhari has a long course through the central part of the district.

Minakhan CD Block has an area of 158.82 km^{2}. It has 1 panchayat samity, 8 gram panchayats, 109 gram sansads (village councils), 74 mouzas and 73 inhabited villages. Minakhan police station serves this block. Headquarters of this CD Block is at Minakhan.

Gram panchayats of Minakhan block/ panchayat samiti are: Atpukur, Chaital, Dhuturdaha, Minakhan, Bamanpukur, Champali, Kumarjole and Mohanpur.

=== Sundarbans ===
The Sundarbans is a flat lowland susceptible to storm surges along the 260 km shoreline of the Bay of Bengal. The total expanse of Sundarbans is about 2.05 million hectares (8,000 square miles). Of this, only 0.42 million hectares (1,629 square miles or 10,43,000 acres) are under the reserve forests including about 0.19 million hectares covered by creeks and channels. The area is prone to natural calamities such as cyclones, thunderstorms with occasional hail and floods. There are more than 63,400 km of embankments but the floods caused by high tidal bores, often wash away much of the embankments, already weakened and broken by earlier cyclonic storms.

In May 2009, the district was hit by high speed cyclone named Aila and subsequent rainfall which continued for two days. This created a disaster in 20 out of 22 blocks of the district. 10 out of 27 municipalities of the district were also severely affected.

Six CD Blocks of North 24 Parganas are included in the Sundabans area – Hingalganj, Hasnabad, Sandeskhali I and II, Minakhan and Haora. The south-eastern part of the district gradually merges into the Sunderbans.

== Demographics ==
=== Population ===
As per 2011 Census of India Minakhan CD Block had a total population of 199,084, of which 191,973 were rural and 7,111 were urban. There were 101,827 (51%) males and 97,257 (49%) females. Population below 6 years was 27,645. Scheduled Castes numbered 60,578 (30.43%) and Scheduled Tribes numbered 18,564 (9.32%).

As per 2001 census, Minakhan block has a total population of 168,233 out of which 86,772 were males and 81,461 were females.

There are two census towns in Minakhan CD Block (2011 census figures in brackets): Minakhan (3,474) and Balihati (3,637).

Large villages in Mina Khan CD Block (2011 census figures in brackets): Uchildaha (6,986), Atpukur (7,717), Mohanpur (12,459), Baukhola (4,690), Debitala (5,744), Bargan Gopalpur (4,065), Kumarjol (7,967), Jaygram (4,962), Taplakushangra (4,738), Bamanpukuria (6,421) and Chaital (11,927).

North 24 Parganas district is densely populated, mainly because of the influx of refugees from East Pakistan (later Bangladesh). With a density of population of 2,182 per km^{2} in 1971, it was 3rd in terms of density per km^{2} in West Bengal after Kolkata and Howrah, and 20th in India. According to the District Human Development Report: North 24 Parganas, “High density is also explained partly by the rapid growth of urbanization in the district. In 1991, the percentage of urban population in the district has been 51.23.”

Decadal Population Growth Rate (%)

View source data.

The decadal growth of population in Minakhan CD Block in 2001-2011 was 17.83%. The decadal growth of population in Minakhan CD Block in 1991-2001 was 23.01%.

The decadal growth rate of population in North 24 Parganas district was as follows: 47.9% in 1951-61, 34.5% in 1961-71, 31.4% in 1971-81, 31.7% in 1981-91, 22.7% in 1991-2001 and 12.0% in 2001-11. The decadal growth rate for West Bengal in 2001-11 was 13.93%. The decadal growth rate for West Bengal was 17.84% in 1991-2001, 24.73% in 1981-1991 and 23.17% in 1971-1981.

Only a small portion of the border with Bangladesh has been fenced and it is popularly referred to as a porous border. It is freely used by Bangladeshi infiltrators, terrorists, smugglers, criminals et al.

=== Literacy ===
As per the 2011 census, the total number of literates in Minakhan CD Block was 122,283 (71.33% of the population over 6 years) out of which males numbered 67,728 (77.20% of the male population over 6 years) and females numbered 54,555 (65.17% of the female population over 6 years). The gender disparity (the difference between female and male literacy rates) was 8.47%.

See also – List of West Bengal districts ranked by literacy rate

Literacy in CD blocks of
North 24 Parganas district
Barasat Sadar subdivision
Amdanga – 80.69%
Deganga – 79.65%
Barasat I – 81.50%
Barasat II – 77.71%
Habra I – 83.15%
Habra II – 81.05%
Rajarhat – 83.13%
Basirhat subdivision
Baduria – 78.75%
Basirhat I – 72.10%
Basirhat II – 78.30%
Haroa – 73.13%
Hasnabad – 71.47%
Hingalganj – 76.85%
Minakhan – 71.33%
Sandeshkhali I – 71.08%
Sandeshkhali II – 70.96%
Swarupnagar – 77.57%
Bangaon subdivision
Bagdah – 75.30%
Bangaon – 79.71%
Gaighata – 82.32%
Barrackpore subdivision
Barrackpore I – 85.91%
Barrackpore II – 84.53%
Source: 2011 Census: CD Block Wise
Primary Census Abstract Data

=== Language and religion ===
Religion in Minakhan CD block (2011)
Islam	50.60%
Hinduism	48.77%
Christianity	0.52%
Other or not stated	0.11%

In the 2011 census Muslims numbered 102,733 and formed 50.60% of the population Minakhan. Hindus numbered 98,091 and formed 48.77% of the population. Others numbered 1,260 and formed 0.63% of the population.

In 1981 Muslims numbered 41,422 and formed 54.10% of the population and Hindus numbered 35,099 and formed 45.80% of the population. In 1991 Muslims numbered 76,169 and formed 55.45% of the population and Hindus numbered 60,332 and formed 43.92% of the population in Minakhan CD Block. (1981 and 1991 census was conducted as per jurisdiction of the police station). In 2001 in Minakhan CD block Hindus were 85,070 (50.35%) and Muslims 82,944 (49.09%).

In the 2011 census, Hindus numbered 7,352,769 and formed 73.46% of the population in North 24 Parganas district. Muslims numbered 2,584,684 and formed 25.82% of the population. In West Bengal Hindus numbered 64,385,546 and formed 70.53% of the population. Muslims numbered 24,654,825 and formed 27.01% of the population.

Bengali is the predominant language, spoken by 99.62% of the population.

== Rural Poverty ==
38.42% of households in Minakhan CD Block lived below poverty line in 2001, against an average of 29.28% in North 24 Parganas district.

== Economy ==
=== Livelihood ===
Livelihood
in Minakhan CD Block
1. Cultivators (15.1%)
2. Agricultural labourers (42.8%)
3. Household industries (5.93%)
4. Other Workers (36.1%)

In Minakhan CD Block in 2011, amongst the class of total workers, cultivators numbered 10,316 and formed 15.10% of the total workers, agricultural labourers numbered 29,259 and formed 42.82%, household industry workers numbered 4,053 and formed 5.93% and other workers numbered 24,699 and formed 36.15%. Total workers numbered 68,327 and formed 34.32% of the total population, and non-workers numbered 130,757 and formed 65.68% of the population.

In more than 30 percent of the villages in North 24 Parganas, agriculture or household industry is no longer the major source of livelihood for the main workers there. The CD Blocks in the district can be classified as belonging to three categories: border areas, Sundarbans area and other rural areas. The percentage of other workers in the other rural areas category is considerably higher than those in the border areas and Sundarbans area.

Note: In the census records a person is considered a cultivator, if the person is engaged in cultivation/ supervision of land owned by self/government/institution. When a person who works on another person’s land for wages in cash or kind or share, is regarded as an agricultural labourer. Household industry is defined as an industry conducted by one or more members of the family within the household or village, and one that does not qualify for registration as a factory under the Factories Act. Other workers are persons engaged in some economic activity other than cultivators, agricultural labourers and household workers. It includes factory, mining, plantation, transport and office workers, those engaged in business and commerce, teachers, entertainment artistes and so on.

=== Infrastructure ===
There are 73 inhabited villages in Minakhan CD Block. 100% villages have power supply. 69 villages (94.52%) have drinking water supply. 16 villages (21.92%) have post offices. 65 villages (93.18%) have telephones (including landlines, public call offices and mobile phones). 23 villages (31.51%) have a pucca approach road and 21 villages (28.77%) have transport communication (includes bus service, rail facility and navigable waterways). 1 village (1.37%) has an agricultural credit society and 6 villages (8.22% ) have banks.

=== Agriculture ===
The North 24 Parganas district Human Development Report opines that in spite of agricultural productivity in North 24 Parganas district being rather impressive 81.84% of rural population suffered from shortage of food. With a high urbanisation of 54.3% in 2001, the land use pattern in the district is changing quite fast and the area under cultivation is declining. However, agriculture is still the major source of livelihood in the rural areas of the district.

From 1977 on wards major land reforms took place in West Bengal. Land in excess of land ceiling was acquired and distributed amongst the peasants. Following land reforms land ownership pattern has undergone transformation. In 2010-11, persons engaged in agriculture in Minakhan CD Block could be classified as follows: bargadars 10,011 (15.34%), patta (document) holders 9,963 (15.27%), small farmers (possessing land between 1 and 2 hectares) 3,344 (5.12%), marginal farmers (possessing land up to 1 hectare) 20,808 (31.88%) and agricultural labourers 21,140 (32.39%).

Minakhan CD Block had 46 fertiliser depots, 4 seed stores and no fair price shop in 2010-11.

In 2010-11, Minakhan CD Block produced 10,910 tonnes of Aman paddy, the main winter crop from 4,308 hectares, 123 tonnes of Aus paddy (summer crop) from 65 hectares, 6,926 tonnes of wheat from 2,658 hectares and 900 tonnes of potatoes from 45 hectares. It also produced pulses and oilseeds.

There were no irrigation facilities in Minakhan in 2010-11.

=== Pisciculture ===
In 2010-11, the net area under effective pisciculture in Minakhan CD Block was 6,450.46 hectares. 17,638 persons were engaged in the profession. Approximate annual production was 193,513.8 quintals.

=== Banking ===
In 2010-11, Minakhan CD Block had offices of 4 commercial banks and 1 gramin bank.

== Transport ==
In 2010-11, Minakhan CD Block had 7 ferry services and 12 originating/ terminating bus routes. The nearest railway station is 20 km from CD Block headquarters.

SH 3 passes through this CD Block. SH 2 terminates at its junction with SH 3 at Malancha.

== Education ==
- Sundarban Minority B.Ed College
- Bamanpukur Humayun Kabir Mahavidyalaya was established at Bamanpukuria in 1973.

In 2010-11, Minakhan CD Block had 83 primary schools with 15,856 students, 2 middle schools with 653 students, 6 high schools with 3,673 students and 7 higher secondary schools with 6,857 students. Minakhan CD Block had 1 general college with 1,220 students and 411 institutions for special and non-formal education with 15,555 students.

As per the 2011 census, in Minakhan CD Block, amongst the 73 inhabited villages, 17 villages did not have a school, 17 villages had more than 1 primary school, 22 villages had at least 1 primary and 1 middle school and 11 villages had at least 1 middle and 1 secondary school.

== Healthcare ==
In 2011, Minakhan CD Block had 1 rural hospital and 2 primary health centres, with total 41 beds and 7 doctors (excluding private bodies). It had 39 family welfare subcentres. 2,303 patients were treated indoors and 74,623 patients were treated outdoor in the hospitals, health centres and subcentres of the CD Block.

Minakhan Rural Hospital at Minakhan with 25 beds functions as the main medical facility in Minakhan CD Block. There are primary health centres at Nimichi (with 6 beds) and Duturdaha (with 10 beds).

Minakhan block is one of the areas where ground water is affected by arsenic contamination.
