= Usha Rani Mondal =

Indian politician

Usha Rani Mondal ঊষা রানী মণ্ডল

Member of the West Bengal Legislative Assembly
- Incumbent
- Assumed office 13 May 2011
- Preceded by: Constituency established
- Constituency: Minakhan

Personal details
- Party: All India Trinamool Congress (until 2026); Mamata All India Trinamool Congress (from 2026)

Usha Rani Mondal is an Indian politician. In 2011,2016, 2021 and 2026 she was elected as MLA of Minakhan Vidhan Sabha Constituency in West Bengal Legislative Assembly. She is an Mamata All India Trinamool Congress politician.
