= Sonakhali, Basanti =

Sonakhali
- Village
- Location in West Bengal Location in India
- Coordinates: 22.2125°N 88.7133°E
- Country: India
- State: West Bengal
- District: South 24 Parganas
- CD block: Basanti

Area
  - Total: 8.80 km^{2} (3.40 sq mi)
- Elevation: 6 m (20 ft)

Population (2011)
  - Total: 10,582
  - Density: 1,200/km^{2} (3,110/sq mi)

Languages
  - Official: Bengali
  - Additional official: English
- Time zone: UTC+5:30 (IST)
- PIN: 743312
- Telephone code: +91 3218
- Vehicle registration: WB-19 to WB-22, WB-95 to WB-99
- Lok Sabha constituency: Jaynagar (SC)
- Vidhan Sabha constituency: Basanti (SC)
- Website: www.s24pgs.gov.in

Sonakhali is a village within the jurisdiction of the Basanti police station in the Basanti CD block in the Canning subdivision of the South 24 Parganas district in the Indian state of West Bengal.

== Geography ==
Places in Canning subdivision (Canning I & II, Basanti, Gosaba CD blocks) in South 24 Parganas district
R: rural/ urban centre
Places linked with coastal activity are marked in blue
Owing to space constraints in the small map, the actual locations in a larger map may vary slightly

=== Area overview ===
Canning subdivision has a very low level of urbanization. Only 12.37% of the population lives in the urban areas and 87.63% lives in the rural areas. There are 8 census towns in Canning I CD block and only 2 in the rest of the subdivision. The entire district is situated in the Ganges Delta with numerous islands in the southern part of the region. The area (shown in the map alongside) borders on the Sundarbans National Park and a major portion of it is a part of the Sundarbans settlements. It is a flat low-lying area in the South Bidyadhari plains. The Matla River is prominent and there are many streams and water channels locally known as khals. A comparatively recent country-wide development is the guarding of the coastal areas with a special coastal force.

Note: The map alongside presents some of the notable locations in the subdivision. All places marked in the map are linked in the larger full screen map.

=== Location ===
Sonakhali is located at 22°12′45″N 88°42′48″E. It has an average elevation of 6 metres (20 ft).

== Demographics ==
According to the 2011 Census of India, Sonakhali had a total population of 10,582, of which 5,243 (51%) were males and 5,159 (49%) were females. There were 1,654 persons in the age range of 0 to 6 years. The total number of literate persons in Sonakhali was 6,495 (72.75% of the population over 6 years).

== Civic administration ==
=== CD block HQ ===
The headquarters of the Basanti CD block are located at Sonakhali.

== Transport ==
Sonakhali is on the State Highway 3 (locally popular as Basanti Highway).

== Education ==
Sonakhali High School is a Bengali-medium co-educational institution, established in 1968. It has facilities for teaching from class VI to class XII.

== Healthcare ==
Basanti Rural Hospital at Basanti, with 30 beds, is the major government medical facility in the Basanti CD block.
