= Minakhan, North 24 Parganas =

Minakhan
- Census Town
- Location in West Bengal, India Minakhan (India)
- Coordinates: 22.50785°N 88.731356°E
- Country: India
- State: West Bengal
- District: North 24 Parganas

Population (2011)
  - Total: 3,474

Languages
  - Official: Bengali, English
- Time zone: UTC+5:30 (IST)
- PIN: 743441 (Minakhan)
- Telephone/STD code: 03217
- Lok Sabha constituency: Basirhat
- Vidhan Sabha constituency: Minakhan
- Website: north24parganas.nic.in

Minakhan is a census town in the Minakhan CD block in the Basirhat subdivision of the North 24 Parganas district in the state of West Bengal, India.

== Geography ==
Cities, towns and locations in Basirhat subdivision, North 24 Parganas district
M: municipal town, CT: census town, R: rural/ urban centre
Owing to space constraints in the small map, the actual locations in a larger map may vary slightly

=== Location ===
Minakhan is located at 22.50785°N 88.731356°E.

=== Area overview ===
The area shown in the map is a part of the Ichhamati-Raimangal Plain, located in the lower Ganges Delta. It contains soil of mature black or brownish loam to recent alluvium. Numerous rivers, creeks and khals criss-cross the area. The tip of the Sundarbans National Park is visible in the lower part of the map (shown in green but not marked). The larger full screen map shows the full forest area. A large section of the area is a part of the Sundarbans settlements. The densely populated area is an overwhelmingly rural area. Only 12.96% of the population lives in the urban areas and 87.04% of the population lives in the rural areas.

Note: The map alongside presents some of the notable locations in the subdivision. All places marked in the map are linked in the larger full screen map.

== Civic administration ==
=== Police station ===
Minakhan police station, located at Bamonpukur, covers an area of 113.06 km^{2} and serves a population of 156,502. It has jurisdiction over Minakhan CD block.

=== CD block HQ ===
The headquarters of Minakhan CD block are located at Minakhan.

== Demographics ==
According to the 2011 Census of India, Minakhan had a total population of 3,474, of which 1,796 (52%) were males and 1,678 (48%) were females. Population in the age range 0–6 years was 436. The total number of literate persons in Minakhan was 2,522 (83.02% of the population over 6 years).

== Transport ==
State Highway 3 passes through Minakhan.

== Education ==
Bamanpukur Humayun Kabir Mahavidyalaya at Bamanpukur on SH 3 and Bamanpukuria S.M.M. High School are located near Minakhan.

== Healthcare ==
Minakhan Rural Hospital with 25 beds, located at Minakhan, is the main medical facility in Minakhan CD block. There are primary health centres at Nimichi and Dhuturdaha.
