= State Highway 3 (West Bengal) =

State highway in West Bengal, India

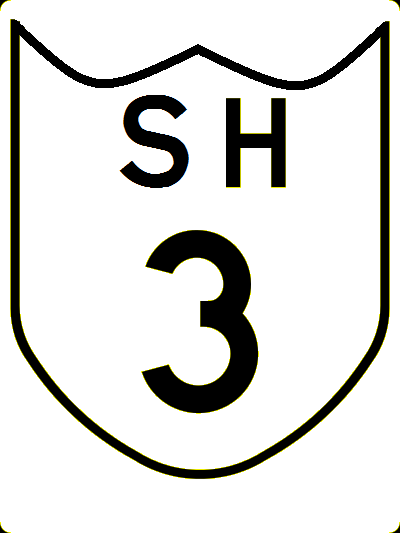
State Highway 3

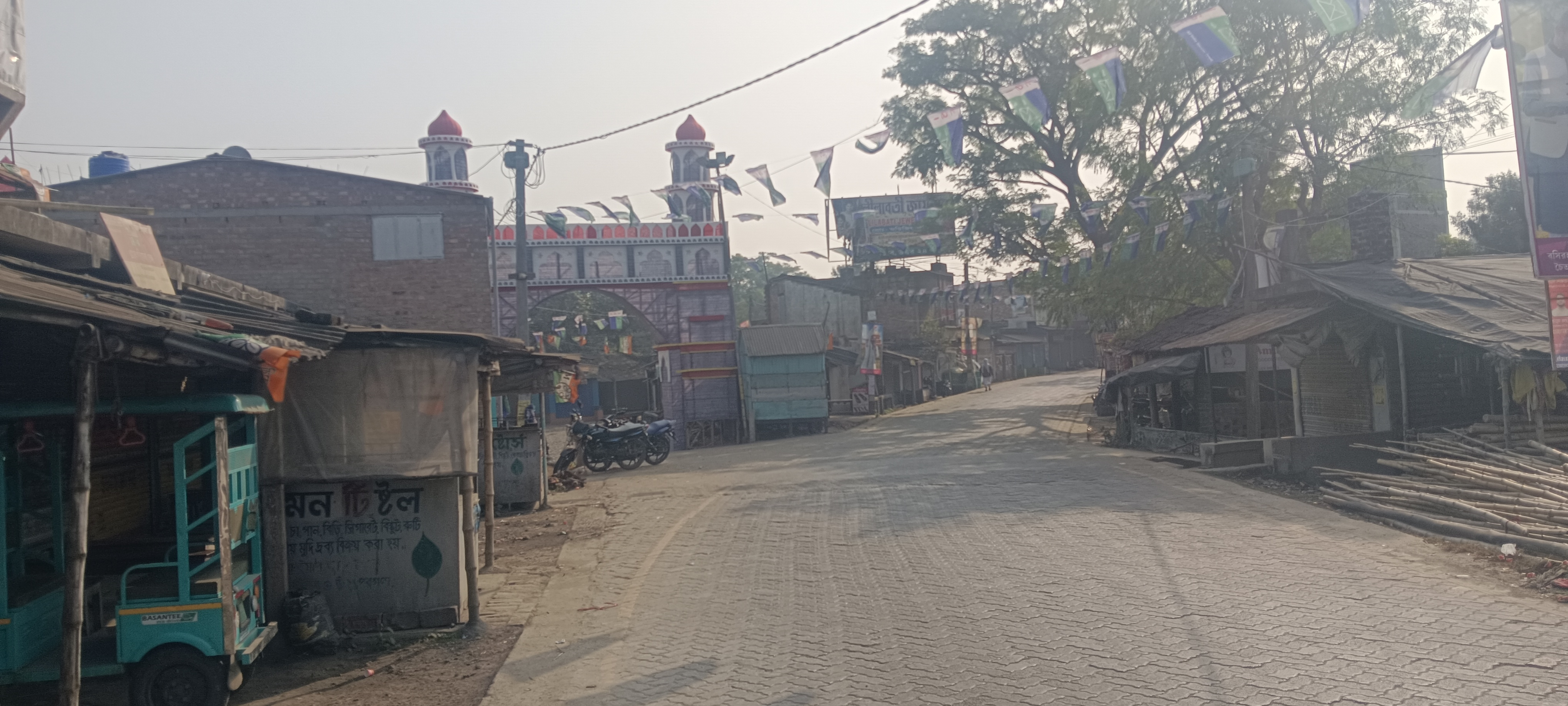

Route information
- Length: 260 km (160 mi)

Major junctions
- From: Krishnanagar junction with SH 8
- NH 112 from Bangaon to Gaighata; NH 12 from Baguiati to Science City; SH 2 at Kholapota
- To: Gosaba

Location
- Country: India
- State: West Bengal
- Districts: Nadia, North 24 Parganas, South 24 Parganas

Highway system
- Roads in India; Expressways; National; State; Asian; State Highways in West Bengal

State Highway 3 (West Bengal) is a state highway in West Bengal, India.

== Route ==
SH 3 originates from Krishnanagar and passes through Hanskhali, Bagula, Helencha, Bangaon, Gaighata, Maslandapur, Baduria, Kholapota, Haroa, Rajarhat, Lauhati, Baguiati, Dhapa, Bhangar, Bamanpukuria, Minakhan, Nalmuri, Canning Town, Bhangonkhali, Sonakhali, Basanti and terminates at Godkhali near Gosaba.

The total length of SH 3 is 260 km.

Districts traversed by SH 3 are:
Nadia district (0 – 32 km)
North 24 Parganas district (32 – 155 km)
Kolkata district (155 – 164 km)
South 24 Parganas district (164 – 260 km)

== Road sections ==
It is divided into different sections as follows:

Road Section	District	CD Block	Length (km)
Krishnanagar-Hanskhali-Duttaphulia	Nadia	Krishnanagar I, Hanskhali, Ranaghat II	32
Duttaphulia-Helencha-Ganrapota-Dharammapukuria-Bangaon	North 24 Parganas	Ranaghat II, Bagdah, Bangaon	36
Bangaon-Gaighata via NH 112	North 24 Parganas	Bongaon	17
Gaighata-Maslandapur-Bagjola-Baduria-Kholapota	North 24 Parganas	Gaighata, Habra I, Baduria	27
Kholapota-Sikra Kulingram (Gopalpur More) via SH 2	North 24 Parganas	Basirhat II	2
Sikra Kulingram (Gopalpur More)-Kendua-Haroa	North 24 Parganas	Basirhat II, Haroa	16
Haroa-Goalpota-Lauhati-Rajarhat-Chinar Park-Baguiati	North 24 Parganas	Haroa, Minakhan, Rajarhat	29
Baguiati-Ultadanga via VIP Road	North 24 Parganas	Bidhannagar Municipal Corporation, South Dum Dum	8
Ultadanga-Dhapa via EM Bypass	Kolkata	Kolkata Municipal Corporation	9
Dhapa-Topsia-Bhojerhat-Ghatakpukur-Bhangar-Minakhan-Malancha-Sorberia-Basanti-Godkhali (Gosaba) via Basanti Highway	South 24 Parganas	Bhangar I, Bhangar II, Canning II, Basanti	96

== See also ==
- List of state highways in West Bengal
