= Basanti (community development block) =

Community Development Block in West Bengal, India

- Community Development Block
- Location of Basanti community development block in South 24 Parganas district
- Coordinates: 22.1983°N 88.7139°E
- Country: India
- State: West Bengal
- Division: Presidency
- District: South 24 Parganas
- Subdivision: Canning
- Headquarters: Sonakhali

Government
  - Gram Panchayats: Amjhara, Basanti, Bharatgarh, Charabidya, Chunakhali, Foolmalancha, Jharkhali, Jyotishpur, Kanthalberia, Maszidbati, Nafarganj, Ramchandrakhali, Uttar Mokamberia
  - Lok Sabha constituencies: Jaynagar
  - Vidhan Sabha constituencies: Basanti, Gosaba

Area
  - Total: 404.21 km^{2} (156.07 sq mi)

Population (2011)
  - Total: 336,717
  - Density: 833.02/km^{2} (2,157.5/sq mi)
  - Urban: 6,625

Demographics
  - Literacy: 68.32 per cent
  - Sex ratio: 966 ♂/♀

Languages
  - Official: Bengali
  - Additional official: English
- Time zone: UTC+05:30 (IST)
- Website: s24pgs.gov.in

Basanti is a community development block that forms an administrative division in Canning subdivision of South 24 Parganas district in the Indian state of West Bengal.

== Geography ==

Basanti CD block is located at 22.1983°N 88.7139°E. It has an average elevation of 6 metres (20 ft).

Basanti CD block is bounded by Canning II CD block in the north, Sandeshkhali II CD block in North 24 Parganas district and Gosaba CD block in parts of the east, Sundarbans forests in parts of the east and south, Kultali and Canning I CD blocks in the west.

South 24 Parganas district is divided into two distinct physiographic zones: the marine-riverine delta in the north and the marine delta zone in the south. As the sea receded southwards, in the sub-recent geological period, a large low-lying plain got exposed. Both tidal inflows and the rivers have been depositing sediments in this plain. The periodical collapse of both the natural levees and man-made embankments speed up the process of filling up of the depressions containing brackish water wetlands. The marine delta in the south is formed of interlacing tidal channels. As non-saline water for irrigation is scarce, agriculture is Monsoon dominated. Some parts of the wetlands are still preserved for raising fish.

Basanti CD block has an area of 404.21 km^{2}. It has 1 panchayat samity, 13 gram panchayats, 133 gram sansads (village councils), 67 mouzas and 65 inhabited villages, as per the District Statistical Handbook for South Twenty-four Parganas. Basanti and Jharkhali Coastal police stations serve this CD Block. Headquarters of this CD block is at Sonakhali.

Basanti CD block has 198.723 km of embankments. Breaches in these embankments varied from 6.6 km in 2002-03 to 42.3 km in 2006-07. Embankments raised along rivers are of critical importance for the safety of lives and protection of crops, against daily tides and tidal surges. Technologically the embankment structures are weak and there is need of proper drainage of accumulated rain water through sluice gates. Crude cuts in embankments for drainage of accumulated rain water and channels built for providing water to large fisheries (bheris) also add to the hazards. Cyclones and tropical depressions are regular threats.

Gram Panchayats of Basanti CD block/panchayat samiti are: Amjhara, Basanti, Bharatgarh, Charabidya, Chunakhali, Foolmalancha, Jharkhali, Jyotishpur, Kanthalberia, Maszidbati, Nafarganj, Ramchandrakhali and Uttar Mokamberia.

== Demographics ==
=== Population ===
As per 2011 Census of India, Basanti CD block had a total population of 336,717, of which 330,092 were rural and 6,625 were urban. There were 171,279 (51%) males and 165,438 (49%) females. Population below 6 years was 50,770. Scheduled Castes numbered 119,631 (35.53%) and Scheduled Tribes numbered 20,060 (5.96%).

As per 2001 Census of India, Basanti CD block had a total population of 278,543, out of which 142,487 were males and 136,056 were females. Basanti CD block registered a population growth of 22.72 per cent during the 1991-2001 decade. Decadal growth for South 24 Parganas district was 20.89 per cent. Decadal growth in West Bengal was 17.84 per cent. Scheduled Castes at 112,246 formed more than one-third the population. Scheduled Tribes numbered 21,020.

Census Town in Basanti CD block (2011 census figures in brackets): Basanti (6,625).

Large villages (with 4,000+ population) in Basanti CD block (2011 census figures in brackets): Kumarkhali (12,021), Char Bidyarabad (13,035), Chunakhali (9,241), Baria (4,883), Purba Bayar Siong (4,538), Sachea Khali (4,372), Manasakhali (5,019), Lebukhali (6,973), Chitrakhali (7,208), Narayantala (5,416), Bhangonkhali (15,127), Phul Malancha (14,614), Tilkumar (8,913), Khari Machan (5,704), Dhuri (9,411), Amjhara (6,179), Kathalberia (14,113), Sonakhali (10,582), Uttar Sonakhali (6,202), Khirishkhali (4,800), Ramchandrakhali (7,849), Kala Hazra (4,626), Hogalduri (4,862), Gadkhali (4,685), Jyotishpur (4,833), Radharanipur (4,976), Hiranmoypur (6,562), Bharatgar (6,413), Dakshin Mokamberia (5,160), Kalidanga (4,134), Parbattipur (4,048), Lot No. 126 (15,695), Goran Bose (12,642) and Birinchibari (5,652).

Other villages in Basanti CD block include (2011 census figures in brackets): Nafarganj (3,744) and Uttar Mokamberia (3,446).

=== Literacy ===
As per the 2011 census, the total number of literates in Basanti CD block was 195,336 (68.31% of the population over 6 years) out of which males numbered 110,229 (75.75% of the male population over 6 years) and females numbered 85,137 (60.62% of the female population over 6 years). The gender disparity (the difference between female and male literacy rates) was 15.13%.

As per 2011 Census of India, literacy in South 24 Parganas district was 77.51 Literacy in West Bengal was 77.08% in 2011. Literacy in India in 2011 was 74.04%.

As per 2001 Census of India, Basanti CD block had a total literacy of 56.98 per cent for the 6+ age group. While male literacy was 68.95 per cent female literacy was 44.33 per cent. South 24 Parganas district had a total literacy of 69.45 per cent, male literacy being 79.19 per cent and female literacy being 59.01 per cent.

See also – List of West Bengal districts ranked by literacy rate

Literacy in CD blocks of
South 24 Parganas district
Alipore Sadar subdivision
Bishnupur I – 78.33%
Bishnupur II – 81.37%
Budge Budge I – 80.57%
Budge Budge II – 79.13%
Thakurpukur Maheshtala – 83.54%
Baruipur subdivision
Baruipur – 76.46%
Bhangar I – 72.06%
Bhangar II – 74.49%
Jaynagar I – 73.17%
Jaynagar II – 69.71%
Kultali – 69.37%
Sonarpur – 79.70%
Canning subdivision
Basanti – 68.32%
Canning I – 70.76%
Canning II – 66.51%
Gosaba – 78.98%
Diamond Harbour subdivision
Diamond Harbour I – 75.72%
Diamond Harbour II – 76.91%
Falta – 77.17%
Kulpi – 75.49%
Magrahat I – 73.82%
Magrahat II – 77.41%
Mandirbazar – 75.89%
Mathurapur I – 73.93%
Mathurapur II – 77.77%
Kakdwip subdivision
Kakdwip – 77.93%
Namkhana – 85.72
Patharpratima – 82.11%
Sagar – 84.21%
Source: 2011 Census: CD Block Wise
Primary Census Abstract Data

=== Language ===
Languages of Basanti CD block (2011)
1. Bengali (99.4%)
2. Hindi (0.60%)
3. Urdu (0.02%)
4. Others (0.01%)

At the time of the 2011 census, 99.37% of the population spoke Bengali, 0.60% Hindi and 0.02% Urdu as their first language.

=== Religion ===
Religion in Basanti CD block (2011)
Hinduism	53.48%
Islam	43.87%
Christianity	2.28%
Other or not stated	0.37%

In the 2011 Census of India, Hindus numbered 179,715 and formed 53.48% of the population in Basanti CD block. Muslims numbered 151,101 and formed 43.87% of the population. Others numbered 8,901 and formed 2.65% of the population. Amongst the others, Christians numbered 7,693. In 2001, Hindus made up 56.23% of the population, while Muslims and Christians were 41.18% and 2.50% of the population respectively.

The proportion of Hindus in South Twenty-four Parganas district has declined from 76.0% in 1961 to 63.2% in 2011. The proportion of Muslims in South Twenty-four Parganas district has increased from 23.4% to 35.6% during the same period. Christians formed 0.8% in 2011.

== Rural poverty ==
As per the Human Development Report for South 24 Parganas district, published in 2009, in Basanti CD block the percentage of households below poverty line was 64.89%. Basanti is one of the poorest CD blocks in the whole country. Within South 24 Parganas district, the poverty ratio in Basanti was ten times more than that in Thakurpukur Maheshtala CD block. The poverty rates were very high in the Sundarbans settlements with all thirteen CD blocks registering poverty ratios above 30% and eight CD blocks had more than 40% of the population in the BPL category. The Sundarban region remains the most backward region in terms of quality of life. As per rural household survey in 2005, the proportion of households in South 24 Parganas with poverty rates below poverty line was 34.11%, way above the state and national poverty ratios.

== Economy ==
=== Livelihood ===
Livelihood
in Basanti CD block
1. Cultivators (18.5%)
2. Agricultural labourers (47.0%)
3. Household industries (10.4%)
4. Other Workers (24.1%)

In Basanti CD block in 2011, amongst the class of total workers, cultivators numbered 24,402 and formed 18.48%, agricultural labourers numbered 62,012 and formed 47.03%, household industry workers numbered 13,772 and formed 10.43% and other workers numbered 31,768 and formed 24.06%. Total workers numbered 132,044 and formed 39.22% of the total population, and non-workers numbered 204,673 and formed 60.78% of the population.

The District Human Development Report points out that in the blocks of region situated in the close proximity of the Kolkata metropolis, overwhelming majority are involved in the non-agricultural sector for their livelihood. On the other hand, in the Sundarban region, overwhelming majority are dependent on agriculture. In the intermediate region, there is again predominance of the non-agricultural sector. Though the region is not very close to Kolkata, many places are well connected and some industrial/ economic development has taken place.

Note: In the census records a person is considered a cultivator, if the person is engaged in cultivation/ supervision of land owned by self/government/institution. When a person who works on another person's land for wages in cash or kind or share, is regarded as an agricultural labourer. Household industry is defined as an industry conducted by one or more members of the family within the household or village, and one that does not qualify for registration as a factory under the Factories Act. Other workers are persons engaged in some economic activity other than cultivators, agricultural labourers and household workers. It includes factory, mining, plantation, transport and office workers, those engaged in business and commerce, teachers, entertainment artistes and so on.

=== Infrastructure ===
There are 64 inhabited villages in Basantii CD block, as per the District Census Handbook, South Twenty-four Parganas, 2011. 100% villages have power supply. 64 villages (100%) have drinking water supply. 33 villages (51.56%) have post offices. 60 villages (93.75%) have telephones (including landlines, public call offices and mobile phones). 32 villages (50.00%) have pucca (paved) approach roads and 35 villages (54.69%) have transport communication (includes bus service, rail facility and navigable waterways). 6 villages (9.38%) have agricultural credit societies and 9 villages (14.06%) have banks.

=== Agriculture ===
South 24 Parganas had played a significant role in the Tebhaga movement launched by the Communist Party of India in 1946. Subsequently, Operation Barga was aimed at securing tenancy rights for the peasants. In Basanti CD block 10,057.41 acres of land was acquired and vested. Out of this 5,538.93 acres or 55.07% of the vested land was distributed amongst the peasants. The total number of patta (document) holders was 9,397.

According to the District Human Development Report, agriculture is an important source of livelihood in South Twentyfour Parganas district. The amount of cultivable land per agricultural worker is only 0.41 hectare in the district. Moreover, the irrigation facilities have not been extended to a satisfactory scale. Agriculture mostly remains a mono-cropped activity.

As per the District Census Handbook, the saline soil of the district is unfit for cultivation, but the non-salty lands are very fertile. While rice is the main food crop, jute is the main cash crop.

In 2013-14, there were 97 fertiliser depots, 14 seed stores and 63 fair price shops in Basanti CD block.

In 2013–14, Basanti CD block produced 80,644 tonnes of Aman paddy, the main winter crop, from 34,705 hectares, 1,907 tonnes of Boro paddy (spring crop) from 533 hectares, 437 tonnes of wheat from 148 hectares, 148 tonnes of jute from 7 hectare. It also produced pulses and oilseeds.

=== Pisciculture ===
In Basanti CD block, in 2013-14, net area under effective pisciculture was 2,115 hectares, engaging 22,718 persons in the profession, and with an approximate annual production of 106,166 quintals.

Pisciculture is an important source of employment in South 24 Parganas district. As of 2001, more than 4.5 lakh people were engaged in Pisciculture. Out of this 2.57 lakhs were from the 13 blocks in the Sundarbans.

=== Banking ===
In 2013-14, Basanti CD block had offices of 4 commercial banks and 4 gramin banks.

=== Backward Regions Grant Fund ===
South 24 Parganas district is listed as a backward region and receives financial support from the Backward Regions Grant Fund. The fund, created by the Government of India, is designed to redress regional imbalances in development. As of 2012, 272 districts across the country were listed under this scheme. The list includes 11 districts of West Bengal.

== Transport ==
Basanti CD block has 10 ferry services, 6 originating/ terminating bus routes. The nearest railway station is 16 km from the block headquarters.

== Education ==
In 2013-14, Basanti CD block had 158 primary schools with 24,185 students, 26 middle schools with 4,973 students, 6 high schools with 2,199 students and 15 higher secondary schools with 16,874 students. Basanti CD block had 1 general degree college with 814 students and 655 institutions for special and non-formal education with 29,619 students.

See also – Education in India

As per the 2011 census, in Basanti CD block, amongst the 64 inhabited villages, 1 village did not have a school, 55 villages had two or more primary schools, 41 villages had at least 1 primary and 1 middle school and 21 villages had at least 1 middle and 1 secondary school.

Sukanta College was established at Bhangonkhali in 2008.

== Healthcare ==
Certain areas of South 24 Parganas district have been identified where ground water is affected by Arsenic Contamination. High levels of arsenic in ground water were found in twelve CD blocks of the district. Water samples collected from tubewells in the affected places contained arsenic above the normal level (10 micrograms per litre as specified by the World Health Organization). The affected CD blocks are Baruipur, Bhangar I, Bhangar II, Bishnupur I, Bishnupur II, Basanti, Budge Budge II, Canning I, Canning II, Sonarpur, Magrahat II and Jaynagar I.

In 2014, Basanti CD block had 1 rural hospital, 3 primary health centre and 5 NGO/ private nursing homes with total 80 beds and 10 doctors (excluding private bodies). It had 63 family welfare subcentres. 1,925 patients were treated indoor and 75,231 patients were treated outdoor in the hospitals, health centres and subcentres of the CD block.

As per 2011 census, in Basanti CD block, 4 villages had primary health centres, 35 villages had primary health subcentres, 5 villages had maternity and child welfare centres, 17 villages had medicine shops and out of the 64 inhabited villages 13 villages had no medical facilities.

Basanti Rural Hospital at Basanti, with 30 beds, is the major government medical facility in Basanti CD block. There are primary health centres at Mahespur (PO Bharadwazpur) (with 6 beds), Kanthalberia (with 10 beds) and Herobhanga-Jharkhali (PO Jharkhali Bazar) (with 6 beds.
