= Bhangar I =

Community Development Block in West Bengal, India

- Community Development Block
- Location of Bhangar I community development block in South 24 Parganas district
- Coordinates: 22.5126°N 88.6097°E
- Country: India
- State: West Bengal
- Division: Presidency
- District: South 24 Parganas
- Subdivision: Baruipur
- Headquarters: Gobindapur

Government
  - Gram Panchayats: Bodra, Chandaneswar-I, Chandaneswar-II, Durgapur, Jagulgachhi, Narayanpur, Pranganj, Shanksahar, Tarda
  - Lok Sabha constituencies: Jadavpur, Jaynagar
  - Vidhan Sabha constituencies: Bhangar, Canning Purba

Area
  - Total: 153.62 km^{2} (59.31 sq mi)

Population (2011)
  - Total: 249,170
  - Density: 1,622.0/km^{2} (4,200.9/sq mi)
  - Urban: 20,642

Demographics
  - Literacy: 72.06 per cent
  - Sex ratio: 951 ♂/♀

Languages
  - Official: Bengali
  - Additional official: English
- Time zone: UTC+05:30 (IST)
- Website: s24pgs.gov.in

Bhangar I is a community development block that forms an administrative division in Baruipur subdivision of South 24 Parganas district in the Indian state of West Bengal.

== Geography ==

The Bhangar I CD block is located at 22°30′45″N 88°36′35″E. It has an average elevation of 9 metres (30 ft).

The Bhangar I CD block is bounded by the Bhangar II CD block in the north, the Minakhan CD block in the North 24 Parganas district in the east, the Canning II CD block in the south and the Sonarpur CD block in the west.

The South 24 Parganas district is divided into two distinct physiographic zones: the marine-riverine delta in the north and the marine delta zone in the south. As the sea receded southwards, in the sub-recent Geological Period, a large low-lying plain got exposed. Both Tidal inflows and the rivers have been depositing sediments in this plain. The periodical collapse of both the natural Levees and man-made embankments speed up the process of filling up of the depressions containing Brackish Water wetlands. The marine delta in the south is formed of interlacing tidal channels. As non-saline water for irrigation is scarce, agriculture is Monsoon dominated. Some parts of the wetlands are still preserved for raising fish.

The Bhangar I CD block has an area of 153.62 km^{2} (59.31 sq mi). It has 1 panchayat samity, 9 gram panchayats, 161 gram sansads (village councils), 83 mouzas and 80 inhabited villages, as per District Statistical Handbook South Twenty-four Parganas. Bhangar and Kolkata Leather Complex police stations serve this CD Block. Headquarters of this CD block is at Gobindapur.

Gram Panchayats of Bhangar I CD block/Panchayat Samiti are: Bodra, Chandaneswar-I, Chandaneswar-II, Durgapur, Jagulgachhi, Narayanpur, Pranganj, Shanksahar and Tarda.

== Demographics ==
=== Population ===
According to the 2011 Census of India, the Bhangar I CD block had a total population of 249,170, of which 228,528 were rural and 20,642 were urban. There were 127,702 (51%) males and 121,465 (49%) females. There were 35,693 persons in the age range of 0 to 6 years. The Scheduled Castes numbered 52,312 (20.99%) and the Scheduled Tribes numbered 3,133 (1.26%).

According to the 2001 Census of India, the Bhangar I CD block had a total population of 204,326, out of which 104,670 were males and 99,656 were females. The Bhangar I CD block registered a population growth of 24.50 per cent during the 1991-2001 decade. Decadal growth for the South 24 Parganas district was 20.89 per cent. Decadal growth in West Bengal was 17.84 per cent. The Scheduled Castes at 47,822 formed around one-fourth the population. The Scheduled Tribes numbered 7,138.

Census Towns in the Bhangar I CD block (2011 census figures in brackets): Maricha (4,842), Bhangar Raghunathpur (6,037) and Gobindapur (9,763).

Large villages (with 4,000+ population) in the Bhangar I CD block (2011 census figures in brackets): Kharamba (4,591), Tardaha Kapasati (11,869), Ghunimeghi (4,151), Narayanpur (9,107), Madhabpur (4,369), Dari Madhabpur (6,556), Chak Barali (5,978), Dhara (5,231), Ghatak Pukur (5,048), Kalikapur (4,591), Rani Gachhi (4,265), Satberia (5,019), Kashinathpur (4,688), Chandaneswar (4,980), Khar Gachhi (4,673), Naora (4,572), Bodra (5,324) and Badi (4,173).

Other villages in the Bhangar I block include (2011 census figures in brackets): Jagulgachhi (2,926), Durgapur (2,650) and Shaksahar (3,698).

=== Literacy ===
According to the 2011 census, the total number of literate persons in the Bhangar I CD block was 153,835 (72.06% of the population over 6 years) out of which males numbered 84,390 (77.03% of the male population over 6 years) and females numbered 69,445 (66.83% of the female population over 6 years). The gender disparity (the difference between female and male literacy rates) was 10.20%.

According to the 2011 Census of India, literacy in the South 24 Parganas district was 77.51 Literacy in West Bengal was 77.08% in 2011. Literacy in India in 2011 was 74.04%.

According to the 2001 Census of India, the Bhangar I CD block had a total literacy of 60.55 per cent for the 6+ age group. While male literacy was 69.57 per cent female literacy was 51.05 per cent. South 24 Parganas district had a total literacy of 69.45 per cent, male literacy being 79.19 per cent and female literacy being 59.01 per cent.

Literacy in CD blocks of
South 24 Parganas district
Alipore Sadar subdivision
Bishnupur I – 78.33%
Bishnupur II – 81.37%
Budge Budge I – 80.57%
Budge Budge II – 79.13%
Thakurpukur Maheshtala – 83.54%
Baruipur subdivision
Baruipur – 76.46%
Bhangar I – 72.06%
Bhangar II – 74.49%
Jaynagar I – 73.17%
Jaynagar II – 69.71%
Kultali – 69.37%
Sonarpur – 79.70%
Canning subdivision
Basanti – 68.32%
Canning I – 70.76%
Canning II – 66.51%
Gosaba – 78.98%
Diamond Harbour subdivision
Diamond Harbour I – 75.72%
Diamond Harbour II – 76.91%
Falta – 77.17%
Kulpi – 75.49%
Magrahat I – 73.82%
Magrahat II – 77.41%
Mandirbazar – 75.89%
Mathurapur I – 73.93%
Mathurapur II – 77.77%
Kakdwip subdivision
Kakdwip – 77.93%
Namkhana – 85.72
Patharpratima – 82.11%
Sagar – 84.21%
Source: 2011 Census: CD Block Wise
Primary Census Abstract Data

=== Language ===
Languages of Bhangar I CD block (2011)
1. Bengali (99.3%)
2. Hindi (0.65%)
3. Urdu (0.02%)
4. Others (0.01%)

At the time of the 2011 census, 99.32% of the population spoke Bengali, 0.65% Hindi and 0.02% Urdu as their first language.

=== Religion ===
Religion in Bhangar I CD block (2011)
Islam	67.38%
Hinduism	32.38%
Other or not stated	0.24%

In the 2011 Census of India, Muslims numbered 167,892 and formed 67.38% of the population in the Bhangar I CD block. Hindus numbered 80,669 and formed 32.38% of the population. Others numbered 609 and formed 0.24% of the population. In 2001, Muslims and Hindus were 65.23% and 34.63% of the population respectively.

The proportion of Hindus in the South Twenty-four Parganas district declined from 76.0% in 1961 to 63.2% in 2011. The proportion of Muslims in the South Twenty-four Parganas district increased from 23.4% to 35.6% during the same period. Christians were 0.8% in 2011.

== Rural poverty ==
According to the Human Development Report for the South 24 Parganas district, published in 2009, in the Bhangar I CD block the percentage of households below poverty line was 28.22%, a moderate level of poverty. In the north-east and mid central portion of the district, all CD blocks, with the exception of the Kulpi CD block, had poverty rates below 30%. As per rural household survey in 2005, the proportion of households in the South 24 Parganas with poverty rates below poverty line was 34.11%, way above the state and national poverty ratios. The poverty rates were very high in the Sundarbans settlements with all the thirteen CD blocks registering poverty ratios above 30% and eight CD blocks had more than 40% of the population in the BPL category.

== Economy ==
=== Livelihood ===
Livelihood
in Bhangar I CD block
1. Cultivators (20.2%)
2. Agricultural labourers (29.6%)
3. Household industries (4.91%)
4. Other workers (45.2%)

In the Bhangar I CD block in 2011, among the class of total workers, cultivators numbered 16,498 and formed 20.21%, agricultural labourers numbered 24,173 and formed 29.62%, household industry workers numbered 4,011 and formed 4.91% and other workers numbered 36,934 and formed 45.25%. Total workers numbered 81,616 and formed 32.76% of the total population, and non-workers numbered 167,554 and formed 67.24% of the population.

The District Human Development Report points out that in the blocks of the region situated in the close proximity of the Kolkata metropolis, overwhelming majority are involved in the non-agricultural sector for their livelihood. On the other hand, in the Sundarban region, overwhelming majority are dependent on agriculture. In the intermediate region, there is again predominance of the non-agricultural sector. Though the region is not very close to Kolkata, many places are well connected and some industrial/ economic development has taken place.

Note: In the census records a person is considered a cultivator, if the person is engaged in cultivation/ supervision of land owned by self/government/institution. When a person who works on another person's land for wages in cash or kind or share, is regarded as an agricultural labourer. Household industry is defined as an industry conducted by one or more members of the family within the household or village, and one that does not qualify for registration as a factory under the Factories Act. Other workers are persons engaged in some economic activity other than cultivators, agricultural labourers and household workers. It includes factory, mining, plantation, transport and office workers, those engaged in business and commerce, teachers, entertainment artistes and so on.

=== Infrastructure ===
There are 80 inhabited villages in the Bhangar I CD block, as per the District Census Handbook, the South Twenty-four Parganas, 2011. 100% villages have power supply. 80 villages (100%) have drinking water supply. 13 villages (16.25%) have post offices. 67 villages (83.75%) have telephones (including landlines, public call offices and mobile phones). 33 villages (41.25%) have pucca (paved) approach roads and 29 villages (36.25%) have transport communication (includes bus service, rail facility and navigable waterways). 6 villages (7.50%) has agricultural credit societies and 13 villages (16.25%) have banks.

=== Agriculture ===
The South 24 Parganas had played a significant role in the Tebhaga movement launched by the Communist Party of India in 1946. Subsequently, “Operation Barga” was aimed at securing tenancy rights for the peasants. In the Bhangar I CD block 2,228.47 acres of land was acquired and vested. Out of this 1,292.81 acres or 58.14% of the vested land was distributed amongst the peasants. The total number of patta holders was 4,364.

According to the District Human Development Report, agriculture is an important source of livelihood in the South Twentyfour Parganas district. The amount of cultivable land per agricultural worker is only 0.41 hectare in the district. Moreover, the irrigation facilities have not been extended to a satisfactory scale. Agriculture mostly remains a mono-cropped activity.

According to the District Census Handbook, the saline soil of the district is unfit for cultivation, but the non-salty lands are very fertile. While rice is the main food crop, jute is the main cash crop.

In 2013–14, there were 72 fertiliser depots, 10 seed stores and 41 fair price shops in the Bhangar I CD block.

In 2013–14, the Bhangar I CD block produced 87,619 tonnes of Aman paddy, the main winter crop, from 32,784 hectares, 2,042 tonnes of Aus paddy (summer crop) from 597 hectares, 6,247 tonnes of Boro paddy (spring crop) from 2300 hectares, 765 tonnes of wheat from 394 hectares, 12,523 tonnes of jute from 554 hectares and 7,773 tonnes of potatoes from 348 hectares. It also produced pulses and oilseeds.

=== Irrigation ===
In the Bhangar I CD block, in 2013–14, 389.82 hectares were irrigated by river lift irrigation and 8.17 hectares by deep tube wells.

Poor irrigation and high soil salinity results in the mono-cropping pattern of cultivation in a major portion of the South 24 Parganas district. As a result of its closeness to the Bay of Bengal, the river waters are mostly saline and are unsuitable for irrigation. Added to the rather gloomy irrigation scenario is the problem of frequent floods.

=== Pisciculture ===
In the Bhangar I CD block, in 2013–14, net area under effective pisciculture was 808 hectares, engaging 6,880 persons in the profession, and with an approximate annual production of 107,980 quintals.

Pisciculture is an important source of employment in the South 24 Parganas district. As of 2001, more than 4.5 lakh people were engaged in pisciculture. Out of this 2.57 lakhs were from the 13 blocks in the Sundarbans settlements.

=== Banking ===
In 2013–14, the Bhangar I CD block had offices of 11 commercial banks and 2 gramin banks.

=== Backward Regions Grant Fund ===
The South 24 Parganas district is listed as a backward region and receives financial support from the Backward Regions Grant Fund. The fund, created by the Government of India, is designed to redress regional imbalances in development. As of 2012, 272 districts across the country were listed under this scheme. The list includes 11 districts of West Bengal.

== Transport ==
The Bhangar I CD block has 14 originating/ terminating bus routes. The nearest railway station is 24 km from the block headquarters.

== Education ==
In 2013–14, the Bhangar I CD block had 99 primary schools with 14,098 students, 15 middle schools with 1,502 students, 3 high schools with 3,165 students and 14 higher secondary schools with 15,054 students. Bhangar I CD block had 1 general degree college with 5,121 students, 1 technical/ professional institution with 970 students and 357 institutions for special and non-formal education with 24,291 students.

See also Education in India

According to the 2011 census, in the Bhangar I CD block, among the 80 inhabited villages, 2 villages did not have a school, 35 villages had two or more primary schools, 31 villages had at least 1 primary and 1 middle school and 14 villages had at least 1 middle and 1 secondary school.

Bhangar Mahavidyalaya was established at Bhangar in 1997.

== Healthcare ==
Certain areas of the South 24 Parganas district have been identified where ground water is affected by Arsenic Contamination. High levels of arsenic in ground water were found in twelve CD blocks of the district. Water samples collected from tubewells in the affected places contained arsenic above the normal level (10 micrograms per litre as specified by the World Health Organization). The affected CD blocks are Baruipur, Bhangar I, Bhangar II, Bishnupur I, Bishnupur II, Basanti, Budge Budge II, Canning I, Canning II, Sonarpur, Magrahat II and Jaynagar I.

In 2014, the Bhangar I CD block had 1 rural hospital, 1 primary health centre and 5 private nursing homes with total 76 beds and 12 doctors (excluding private bodies). It had 28 family welfare subcentres. 5,292 patients were treated indoor and 90,894 patients were treated outdoor in the hospitals, health centres and subcentres of the CD block.

According to the 2011 census, in the Bhangar I CD block, 2 villages had community health centres, 2 villages had primary health centres, 39 villages had primary health subcentres, 3 villages had maternity and child welfare centres, 1 village had veterinary hospitals and 16 villages had medicine shops. Out of the 80 inhabited villages, 18 had no medical facilities.

Nalmuri Rural Hospital at Nalmuri, with 30 beds, is the major government medical facility in the Bhangar I CD block. There is a primary health centre at Bhatipota (PO Beconta) (with 6 beds).
