= Basanti, South 24 Parganas =

Basanti
- Census Town
- Location in West Bengal Location in India
- Coordinates: 22.1983°N 88.7139°E
- Country: India
- State: West Bengal
- District: South 24 Parganas
- CD block: Basanti

Area
  - Total: 2.32 km^{2} (0.90 sq mi)
- Elevation: 6 m (20 ft)

Population (2011)
  - Total: 6,625
  - Density: 2,860/km^{2} (7,400/sq mi)

Languages
  - Official: Bengali
  - Additional official: English
- Time zone: UTC+5:30 (IST)
- PIN: 743312
- Telephone code: +91 3218
- Vehicle registration: WB-19 to WB-22, WB-95 to WB-99
- Lok Sabha constituency: Jaynagar (SC)
- Vidhan Sabha constituency: Basanti (SC)
- Website: www.s24pgs.gov.in

Basanti is a census town and a gram panchayat within the jurisdiction of the Basanti police station in the Basanti CD block in the Canning subdivision of the South 24 Parganas district in the Indian state of West Bengal.

== Geography ==
Places in Canning subdivision (Canning I & II, Basanti, Gosaba CD blocks) in South 24 Parganas district
R: rural/ urban centre
Places linked with coastal activity are marked in blue
Owing to space constraints in the small map, the actual locations in a larger map may vary slightly

=== Area overview ===
Canning subdivision has a very low level of urbanization. Only 12.37% of the population lives in the urban areas and 87.63% lives in the rural areas. There are 8 census towns in Canning I CD block and only 2 in the rest of the subdivision. The entire district is situated in the Ganges Delta with numerous islands in the southern part of the region. The area (shown in the map alongside) borders on the Sundarbans National Park and a major portion of it is a part of the Sundarbans settlements. It is a flat low-lying area in the South Bidyadhari plains. The Matla River is prominent and there are many streams and water channels locally known as khals. A comparatively recent country-wide development is the guarding of the coastal areas with a special coastal force.

Note: The map alongside presents some of the notable locations in the subdivision. All places marked in the map are linked in the larger full screen map.

=== Location ===
Basanti is located at 22°11′54″N 88°42′50″E. It has an average elevation of 6 metres (20 ft).

Basanti is one of the main deltaic islands in the Sundarbans region, bounded by the Matla and Vidyadhari rivers. Sonakhali, opposite Basanti, is 100 km from Kolkata. Sonakhali and Basanti is connected by Hogol Bridge. Basanti Road is linked to the Eastern metropolitan bypass near Science City in Kolkata. Sundarbans bypass project, costing Rs 2.29 crore has been under implementation since 2002. It will reduce the distance between Kolkata and Basanti by 25 km. The 12-km bypass will connect Dhuri and Jibantala. The Sundarbans settlements, being full of creeks and rivers, need more bridges, especially across the Matla.

== Demographics ==
According to the 2011 Census of India, Basanti had a total population of 6,625, of which 3,447 (52%) were males and 3,178 (48%) were females. There were 728 persons in the age range of 0 to 6 years. The total number of literate persons in Basanti was 4,729 (80.19% of the population over 6 years).

== Civic administration ==
=== Police station ===
Basanti police station covers an area of 428 km^{2}. It has jurisdiction over parts of the Basanti CD block.

== Infrastructure ==
According to the District Census Handbook 2011, Basanti covered an area of 2.3176 km^{2}. Among the civic amenities, the protected water supply involved overhead tank and service reservoir. It had 315 domestic electric connections. Among the medical facilities it had was 1 hospital, 3 dispensaries/ health centres, 2 family welfare centres, 16 medicine shops. Three important commodities it produced were cashew processing, bamboo products, rice.

== Economy ==
=== Agriculture ===
The state government has initiated two plans for agricultural improvement. The "amar bon" (my forest) project aims at planting more trees in the area as a preventive measure towards global warming. Over 14,000,000 saplings will be planted in various places through women, children and NGOs. As the area is surrounded by saline waters in the creeks, the "Rainwater harvesting through Land Shaping" project aims at construction of ponds on 1/5 of the agricultural land and rest of the land is spared for agriculture. The target is to construct 50,000 such ponds.

=== Honey collection ===
Around 20,000 kg of honey is collected every year from forests of Sundarbans. Mostly people from the Canning, Basanti, Gosaba, Kultali, Mathurapur, Patharpratima, Namkhana, Sagar and Kakdwip are honey collectors. The number of honey collectors have dwindled from around 1,500 a few years back to around 700 in 2007. From 1985 until 2004, about 75 honey collectors were killed by tigers in the forests. Now all honey collectors are insured for Rs. 50,000. The forest department has also intensified vigilance during the honey collection period. The range officers and guards are on full alert. No deaths have been reported since 2004.

=== Power ===
West Bengal Renewable Energy Development Agency (WBREDA) has installed a solar-power village electrification programme at Nafarganj village in the Basanti block. A Rs 250 crore rural electrification project is being implemented on the islands to provide the people of the area with power through non-conventional energy sources, as conventional grid supply is not feasible.

90% of the islands remain in darkness after sunset, although efforts are on to provide power to the islands. The state government had appointed the WBREDA as the nodal agency for its solar power project for the Sundarbans. Part of the project cost under the low cost non-conventional energy project was shared by the central government. There are two schemes under the project. Under the first, a small unit priced at Rs. 14,000 each was provided to domestic consumers who had to pay Rs. 3,000 for it while the rest was equally shared between the centre and the state. For the other, consumers have to pay Rs. 8,500 for a big unit while the central government provides a subsidy of Rs. 10,000 and the state shells out Rs. 5,500.

== Transport ==
Basanti is on the State Highway 3.

== Healthcare ==
=== Rural hospital ===
Basanti Rural Hospital at Basanti, with 30 beds, is the major government medical facility in the Basanti CD block.

=== Dominique Lapierre's floating hospitals ===
Four launches with doctors carrying medicines, sophisticated portable X-ray and echo-cardiograph machines, provided by the French author Dominique Lapierre move along the waterways of the Sundarbans to its furthest corners. Residents of such places as Sandeshkhali, Basanti, Gosaba and Kultali have expressed their gratitude to him for his support when he came in 2004. Since 1981, Lapierre has dedicated half of his royalty earnings from his books to sustain a humanitarian movement in the slums of Kolkata and the deprived areas of rural Bengal. For his work, Lapierre was made a citizen of honour of Kolkata.

=== Arsenic contamination ===
A study of the School of Environmental Studies, most of whose surveyors are Jadavpur University scholars, shows the extent of arsenic contamination in the ground water of South 24-Parganas is shocking. High levels of arsenic in ground water was found in 12 blocks of the district. Water samples collected from tubewells in the affected places contained arsenic above the normal level (10 microgram a litre as specified by the World Health Organization). The affected blocks include Basanti.
