= Minakhan Assembly constituency =

Minakhan
- Constituency No. 122 for the West Bengal Legislative Assembly
- Interactive Map Outlining Minakhan Assembly Constituency

Constituency details
- Country: India
- Region: East India
- State: West Bengal
- District: North 24 Parganas
- Lok Sabha constituency: Basirhat
- Established: 2011
- Total electors: 164,494
- Reservation: SC

Member of Legislative Assembly
- 18th West Bengal Legislative Assembly
- Incumbent Usha Rani Mondal
- Party: Mamata All India Trinamool Congress
- Elected year: 2026

Minakhan Assembly constituency is an assembly constituency in North 24 Parganas district in the Indian state of West Bengal. It is reserved for scheduled castes.

== Overview ==
As per orders of the Delimitation Commission, 122 Minakhan Assembly constituency (SC) is composed of the following: Minakhan community development block, and Bakjuri, Kulti, Shalipur and Sonapukur Sankarpur gram panchayats of Haroa community development block.

Minakhan Assembly constituency (SC) is part of 18. Basirhat (Lok Sabha constituency).

== Members of the Legislative Assembly ==
Year	Name	Party
2011	Usha Rani Mondal	All India Trinamool Congress
2016	Usha Rani Mondal	All India Trinamool Congress
2021	Usha Rani Mondal	All India Trinamool Congress
2026	Usha Rani Mondal	All India Trinamool Congress

== Election results ==
=== 2026 ===
2026 West Bengal Legislative Assembly election: Minakhan
Party	Candidate	Votes	%	±%
AITC	Usha Rani Mondal	92,079	42.66	−9.06
BJP	Rudrendra Patra	59,787	27.70	+2.28
Indian Secular Front	Pratik Mondal	55,753	25.83	
NOTA	None of the above	2,616	1.21	−0.65
Majority		32,292	14.96	−11.34
Turnout		215,848	97.21	+7.43
AITC hold		Swing		

=== 2021 ===
2021 West Bengal Legislative Assembly election: Minakhan
Party	Candidate	Votes	%	±%
AITC	Usha Rani Mondal	109,818	51.72	
BJP	Jayanta Mondal	53,988	25.42	
CPI(M)	Pradyut Roy	44,606	21.01	
NOTA	None of the above	3,940	1.86	
Majority		55,830	26.3	
Turnout		212,352	89.78	
AITC hold		Swing		

=== 2016 ===
West Bengal assembly elections, 2016: Minakhan (SC) constituency
Party	Candidate	Votes	%	±%
AITC	Usha Rani Mondal	103,210	55.76	+7.10
CPI(M)	Dinabandhu Mondal	60,612	32.75	−11.19
BJP	Jayanta Mondal	13,566	7.33	+1.82
BSP	Krishna Kinkar Das	3,995	2.16	
NOTA	None of the above	3,718	2.01	
Turnout		185,101	88.55	−3.31
AITC hold		Swing		

=== 2011 ===
West Bengal assembly elections, 2011: Minakhan (SC) constituency
Party	Candidate	Votes	%	±%
AITC	Usha Rani Mondal	73,533	48.66	
CPI(M)	Dilip Roy	66,397	43.94	
BJP	Bhabesh Patra	8,323	5.51	
Independent	Ajit Pramanik	2,849		
Turnout		151,102	91.86	
AITC win (new seat)				
