= Nadakhali =

Nodakhali
- Village
- Location in West Bengal Location in India
- Coordinates: 22.4020°N 88.1782°E
- Country: India
- State: West Bengal
- District: South 24 Parganas
- CD block: Budge Budge II

Area
  - Total: 0.47 km^{2} (0.18 sq mi)
- Elevation: 9 m (30 ft)

Population (2011)
  - Total: 1,132
  - Density: 2,400/km^{2} (6,200/sq mi)

Languages
  - Official: Bengali
  - Additional official: English
- Time zone: UTC+5:30 (IST)
- PIN: 743318
- Telephone code: +91 33
- Vehicle registration: WB-19 to WB-22, WB-95 to WB-99
- Lok Sabha constituency: Diamond Harbour
- Vidhan Sabha constituency: Satgachia
- Website: www.s24pgs.gov.in

Nadakhali is a village within the jurisdiction of the Nadakhali police station in the Budge Budge II CD block in the Alipore Sadar subdivision of the South 24 Parganas district in the Indian state of West Bengal.

== Geography ==
Cities and towns in the western part of Alipore Sadar subdivision (including Budge Budge I & II, Thakurpukur Maheshtala CD blocks) in South 24 Parganas district
M: municipal city/ town, CT: census town, R: rural/ urban centre,
Owing to space constraints in the small map, the actual locations in a larger map may vary slightly
Bakrahat is in Bishnupur II CD block, but Lakshmibala Rural Hospital at Bakrahat serves Budge Budge II CD block and so it is included here.

=== Area overview ===
Alipore Sadar subdivision is the most urbanized part of the South 24 Parganas district. 59.85% of the population lives in the urban areas and 40.15% lives in the rural areas. In the northern portion of the subdivision (shown in the map alongside) there are 21 census towns. The entire district is situated in the Ganges Delta and the subdivision, on the east bank of the Hooghly River, is an alluvial stretch, with industrial development.

Note: The map alongside presents some of the notable locations in the subdivision. All places marked in the map are linked in the larger full screen map.

=== Location ===
Nadakhali is located at 22°24′07″N 88°10′42″E. It has an average elevation of 9 metres (30 ft).

== Demographics ==
According to the 2011 Census of India, Nadakhali had a total population of 1,132, of which 561 (50%) were males and 571 (50%) were females. There are 571 people in the age range of 0 to 6 years. The total number of literate people in Nadakhali was 705 (69.87% of the population over 6 years).

== Civic administration ==
=== Police station ===
Nadakhali police station serves a population of 192,118, spread over parts of the Budge Budge I and the Budge Budge II CD blocks.

== Transport ==
A short stretch of local roads link Nadakhali to the Budge Budge Trunk Road.

Budge Budge railway station is located nearby.

== Education ==
Howri Dinanath School, located nearby, in a Bengali-medium high school with facilities from class V to class X.

== Healthcare ==
Lakshmibala Dutta Rural Hospital, with 30 beds, at Bakrahat, is the major government medical facility in the Budge Budge II CD block.
