= Bakrahat =

Bakhrahat
- Village
- Location in West Bengal Location in India
- Coordinates: 22.4002°N 88.2182°E
- Country: India
- State: West Bengal
- District: South 24 Parganas
- CD block: Bishnupur II

Area
  - Total: 0.69 km^{2} (0.27 sq mi)
- Elevation: 9 m (30 ft)

Population (2011)
  - Total: 3,419
  - Density: 5,000/km^{2} (13,000/sq mi)

Languages
  - Official: Bengali
  - Additional official: English
- Time zone: UTC+5:30 (IST)
- PIN: 743503
- Telephone code: +91 33
- Vehicle registration: WB-19 to WB-22, WB-95 to WB-99
- Lok Sabha constituency: Diamond Harbour
- Vidhan Sabha constituency: Satgachhia
- Website: www.s24pgs.gov.in

Bakhrahat is a village and a gram panchayat within the jurisdiction of the Bishnupur police station in the Bishnupur II CD block in the Alipore Sadar subdivision of the South 24 Parganas district in the Indian state of West Bengal. Along with a Boys' School, Bakhrahat also has the Bakhrahat Girls' High School, which is situated on Borokachari Road.

== Geography ==
Cities and towns in the eastern part of Alipore Sadar subdivision (including Bishnupur I & II CD blocks) in South 24 Parganas district
M: municipal city/ town, CT: census town, R: rural/ urban centre, N: neighbourhood
Owing to space constraints in the small map, the actual locations in a larger map may vary slightly

=== Area overview ===
Alipore Sadar subdivision is the most urbanized part of the South 24 Parganas district. 59.85% of the population lives in the urban areas and 40.15% lives in the rural areas. In the southern portion of the subdivision (shown in the map alongside) there are 15 census towns. The entire district is situated in the Ganges Delta and the subdivision, on the east bank of the Hooghly River, is an alluvial stretch, with industrial development.

Note: The map alongside presents some of the notable locations in the subdivision. All places marked in the map are linked in the larger full screen map.

=== Location ===
Bakrahat is located at 22°24′01″N 88°13′06″E. It has an average elevation of 9 metres (30 ft).

== Demographics ==
According to the 2011 Census of India, Bakrahat had a total population of 3,419, of which 1,744 (51%) were males and 1,675 (49%) were females. There were 293 persons in the age range of 0 to 6 years. The total number of literate people in Bakrahat was 2,896 (92.64% of the population over 6 years).

== Civic Administration ==
=== CD block HQ ===
The headquarters of the Bishnupur II CD block are located at Bakrahat.

== Transport ==
A short stretch of local roads link Bakrahat to the National Highway 12.

== Education ==
S.L.Bajoria Foundation High School is an ICSE, ISC coeducational school at Sanjua, PO Bakrahat.

Bakrahat High School is a boys only institution.

Ariapara High School on Bakrahat Road, Ariapara, is a Bengali-medium coeducational school, established in 1949. It has facilities for teaching from class V to class XII.

== Healthcare ==
Lakshmibala Dutta Rural Hospital, with 30 beds, at Bakrahat, is the major government medical facility in the Budge Budge II CD block.
