= List of cities and towns in West Bengal =

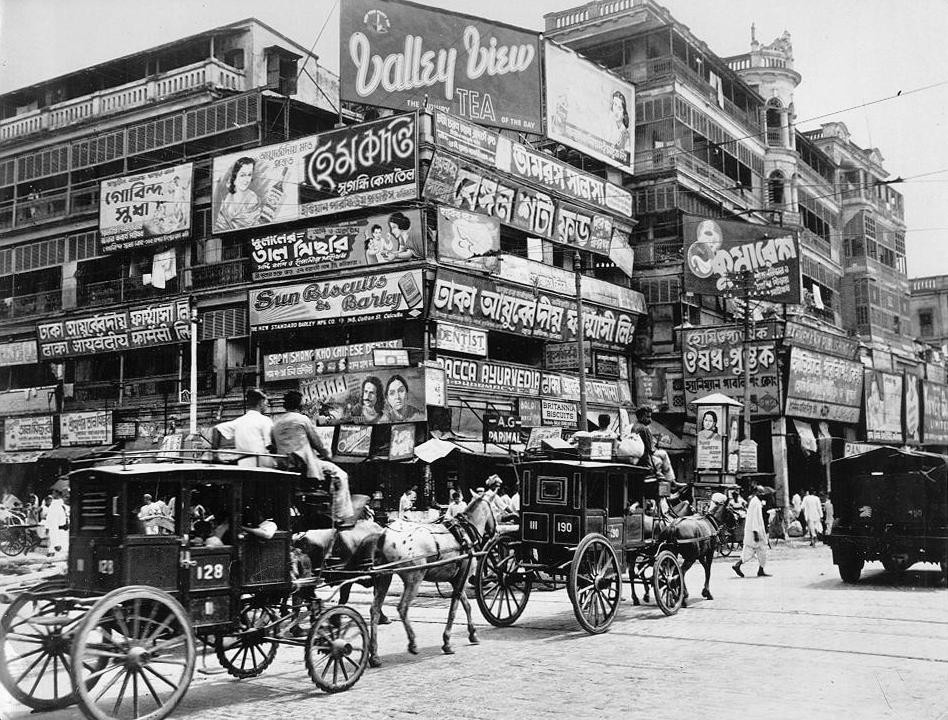
Image of Harrison Street Strand Road and Burra Bazaar in Kolkata (Calcutta) in 1945, shortly before the urban expansion of West Bengal

West Bengal is the state with the second highest population density in India. The state is dotted with several large and medium cities and towns. Historically, the main source of income of the people of West Bengal has been farming, and, as a consequence, the state previously had a large rural population skew. At the turn of the 20th century, however, the role of industry in West Bengal increased substantially, leading to a population move into urban areas.

In 1947, when India gained independence, the erstwhile British Indian province of Bengal was divided into two parts: the eastern region formed East Pakistan, which became Bangladesh in 1971, and the western part joined India as the state of West Bengal. Scores of refugees from the eastern part came to West Bengal, leading to the start of new urban areas, and contributing to the congestion of already established cities like Kolkata.

== Current scenario ==
According to the 2011 Census of India, 128 cities and towns in West Bengal (Note: Announcement of 2 new municipalities was made in October 2021. Bally Municipality was re-established on 12 November 2021.) are classified into the following categories:

=== Municipal Corporations (West Bengal, India) ===
#	City Name	Founder	Year of Establishment	GDP Per Capita (2024)	Population (2011)	District
1	Kolkata Municipal Corporation	British Empire (1758–1947) of England (Europe)	1876	$4,400	4,496,694	Kolkata and South 24 Parganas
2	Bidhannagar Municipal Corporation	Dr. Bidhan Chandra Roy (1948–1962) (First Chief Minister of West Bengal)	2015	$6,000	632,107	North 24 Parganas
3	Howrah Municipal Corporation	Mughal Empire (1526–1757) of Uzbekistan (Central Asia)	1984	$3,000	1,362,561	Howrah
4	Chandernagore Municipal Corporation	French Empire (1534–1951) of France (Europe)	1994	$2,400	166,867	Hooghly
5	Asansol Municipal Corporation	British Empire (1758–1947) of England (Europe)	1994	$3,400	1,243,414	West Burdwan
6	Durgapur Municipal Corporation	Dr. Bidhan Chandra Roy (1948–1962) (First Chief Minister of West Bengal)	1994	$3,600	566,937	West Burdwan
7	Siliguri Municipal Corporation	British Empire (1758–1947) of England (Europe)	1994	$3,500	513,264	Darjeeling and Jalpaiguri

=== Proposed Municipal Corporations ===
- Baharampur, Murshidabad district
- Barasat, North 24 Parganas district
- Bardhaman, Purba Bardhaman district
- Barrackpore, North 24 Parganas district
- Darjeeling, Darjeeling district
- Dum Dum, North 24 Parganas district
- Kharagpur, Paschim Medinipur district
- Maheshtala, South 24 Parganas district
- Malda, Malda district
- Serampore, Hooghly district

=== Municipalities ===
Sl. No.	Town/City Name
1	Alipurduar
2	Arambag
3	Ashoknagar Kalyangarh
4	Baduria
5	Baharampur
6	Baidyabati
7	Bally
8	Balurghat
9	Bangaon
10	Bankura
11	Bansberia
12	Baranagar
13	Barasat
14	Bardhaman
15	Barrackpore
16	Baruipur
17	Basirhat
18	Beldanga
19	Bhadreswar
20	Bhatpara
21	Birnagar
22	Bishnupur
23	Bolpur
24	Budge Budge
25	Buniadpur
26	Chakdaha
27	Champdani
28	Chandrakona
29	Contai
30	Dainhat
31	Dalkhola
32	Dankuni
33	Darjeeling
34	Dhulian
35	Dhupguri
36	Diamond Harbour
37	Dinhata
38	Domkal
39	Dubrajpur
40	Dum Dum
41	Egra
42	English Bazar
43	Falakata
44	Gangarampur
45	Garulia
46	Gayespur
47	Ghatal
48	Gobardanga
49	Guskara
50	Habra
51	Haldia
52	Haldibari
53	Halisahar
54	Haringhata
55	Hugli-Chuchura
56	Islampur
57	Jalpaiguri
58	Jangipur
59	Jaynagar Majilpur
60	Jhalda
61	Jhargram
62	Jiaganj Azimganj
63	Kaliaganj
64	Kalimpong
65	Kalna
66	Kalyani
67	Kamarhati
68	Kanchrapara
69	Kandi
70	Katwa
71	Kharagpur
72	Kharar
73	Khardaha
74	Koch Bihar
75	Konnagar
76	Krishnanagar
77	Kshirpai
78	Kurseong
79	Madhyamgram
80	Maheshtala
81	Mainaguri
82	Mal
83	Mathabhanga
84	Mekliganj
85	Memari
86	Midnapore
87	Murshidabad
88	Nabadwip
89	Naihati
90	Nalhati
91	New Barrackpur
92	North Barrackpur
93	North Dumdum
94	Old Malda
95	Panskura
96	Panihati
97	Pujali
98	Purulia
99	Raghunathpur
100	Raiganj
101	Rajpur Sonarpur
102	Ramjibanpur
103	Rampurhat
104	Ranaghat
105	Rishra
106	Sainthia
107	Santipur
108	Serampore
109	Sonamukhi
110	South Dumdum
111	Suri
112	Taki
113	Tamluk
114	Tarakeswar
115	Titagarh
116	Tufanganj
117	Uluberia
118	Uttarpara Kotrung

=== Notified area ===
Sl. No.	Name
1	Cooper's Camp
2	Mirik
3	Taherpur

== Major cities ==
Rank	Name	District	Type	Population 2011	Male	Female	Population below 5 yrs	Literacy rate
1	Kolkata	Kolkata, Howrah, Hooghly, Nadia, North 24 Parganas, South 24 Parganas	UA	14,112,536	7,319,682	6,792,854	1,063,394	88.33
2	Asansol	Paschim Bardhaman	UA	1,243,008	647,831	595,177	132,560	80.00
3	Siliguri	Darjeeling, Jalpaiguri	UA	701,489	359,750	341,739	72,252	82.05
4	Durgapur	Paschim Bardhaman	UA	581,409	301,700	279,709	51,930	87.70
5	Bardhaman	Purba Bardhaman	UA	347,016	177,055	169,961	25,069	88.62
6	English Bazar	Malda	UA	324,237	175,073	149,164	44,186	81.32
7	Baharampur	Murshidabad	UA	305,609	156,489	149,120	23,182	88.38
8	Habra	North 24 Parganas	UA	304,584	154,861	149,723	23,023	91.03
9	Kharagpur	Paschim Medinipur	UA	293,719	150,487	143,232	25,130	85.61
10	Shantipur	Nadia	UA	288,718	147,299	141,419	24,006	82.67
11	Dankuni	Hooghly	UA	249,840	128,139	121,701	22,956	85.69
12	Dhulian	Murshidabad	UA	239,022	119,151	119,871	45,483	60.06
13	Ranaghat	Nadia	UA	235,583	119,578	116,005	18,575	86.10
14	Haldia	Purba Medinipur	City	200,762	104,852	95,910	21,122	89.06
15	Raiganj	Uttar Dinajpur	UA	199,758	104,966	94,792	22,028	81.71
16	Krishnanagar	Nadia	UA	181,182	91,583	89,599	13,663	88.09
17	Nabadwip	Nadia	UA	175,474	90,810	84,664	13,049	84.57
18	Medinipur	Paschim Medinipur	City	169,127	85,362	83,765	14,365	90.01
19	Jalpaiguri	Jalpaiguri	UA	169,013	85,226	83,787	14,522	86.03
20	Balurghat	Dakshin Dinajpur	UA	164,593	82,466	82,127	10,349	91.66
21	Basirhat	North 24 Parganas	UA	144,891	73,491	71,400	12,578	86.88
22	Bankura	Bankura	City	138,036	70,734	67,302	10,760	87.27
23	Chakdaha	Nadia	UA	132,855	67,135	65,720	9,829	90.95
24	Darjeeling	Darjeeling	UA	132,016	65,839	66,177	7,382	93.17
25	Alipurduar	Alipurduar	UA	127,342	64,898	62,444	10,545	89.16
26	Purulia	Purulia	UA	126,894	65,334	61,560	12,116	81.53
27	Jangipur	Murshidabad	UA	122,875	62,734	60,141	16,299	75.71
28	Bangaon	North 24 Parganas	City	110,668	56,416	54,252	8,452	90.25
29	Cooch Behar	Cooch Behar	UA	106,760	53,803	52,957	7,910	91.75

== List of Urban areas (District-wise) ==
There are there are total 121 municipalities and 7 municipal corporations in West Bengal.

District	Headquarters	Municipal Corporations	Municipalities	Census Towns	Special Urban Units	Total Number of Municipalities
Alipurduar	Alipurduar	-	Alipurduar, Falakata	Alipurduar Railway Junction, Bholar Dabri, Chechakhata, Jaygaon, Paschim Jitpur, Sobhaganj, Uttar Kamakhyaguri, Uttar Latabari	-	2
Bankura	Bankura	-	Bankura, Bishnupur, Sonamukhi	Barjora, Beliatore, Khatra	-	3
Birbhum	Suri	-	Bolpur, Dubrajpur, Nalhati, Rampurhat, Sainthia, Suri	Ahmadpur, Labhpur	-	6
Cooch Behar	Cooch Behar	-	Dinhata, Cooch Behar, Haldibari, Mathabhanga, Mekliganj, Tufanganj	Bhangri Pratham Khanda, Guriahati, Khagrabari, Kharimala Khagrabari	-	6
Dakshin Dinajpur	Balurghat	-	Balurghat, Gangarampur, Buniadpur	-	-	3
Darjeeling	Darjeeling	Siliguri	Darjeeling, Kurseong, Mirik	Bairatisal, Cart Road, Pattabong Tea Garden, Uttar Bagdogra	-	3
Hooghly	Chinsurah	Chandannagar	Arambag, Bansberia, Baidyabati, Bhadreswar, Champdani, Dankuni, Hooghly-Chinsurah, Konnagar, Rishra, Serampore, Tarakeswar, Uttarpara Kotrung	Amodghata, Badhagachhi, Bamunari, Barijhati, Begampur, Chak Bansberia, Chikrand, Dakshin Rajyadharpur, Dharmapur, Kanaipur, Kharsarai, Kodalia, Kulihanda, Madhusudanpur, Mrigala, Monoharpur, Nabagram Colony, Pairagachha, Pandua, Purba Tajpur, Raghunathpur, Rishra, Shankhanagar, Simla, Singur, Garalgachha, Krishnapur, Raghunathpur	-	12
Howrah	Howrah	Howrah	Bally, Uluberia	Andul, Ankurhati, Argari, Bagnan, Balaram Pota, Bally (Jagachha), Bankra, Banupur, Beldubi, Bhandardaha, Bikihakola, Bipra Noapara, Chakapara, Chamrail, Dakshin Jhapardaha, Dhuilya, Domjur, Eksara, Gabberia, Hatgachha, Jagadishpur, Jala Kendua, Jhorhat, Kalara, Kantlia, Kesabpur, Khalia, Khalor, Khantora, Mahiari, Makardaha, Manikpur, Mansinhapur, Nalpur, Natibpur, Naupala, Nibra, Panchla, Panchpara, Paniara, Podara, Raghudebbati, Ramchandrapur, Sahapur, Salap, Sankrail, Santoshpur, Sarenga, Tentulkuli, Uttar Pirpur	-	2
Jalpaiguri	Jalpaiguri	-	Dhupguri, Jalpaiguri, Mainaguri, Mal	Banarhat Tea Garden, Gairkata	-	4
Jhargram	Jhargram	-	Jhargram	-	-	1
Kalimpong	Kalimpong	-	Kalimpong	-	-	1
Kolkata	Kolkata	Kolkata	-	-	-	-
Malda	Malda City	-	English Bazar, Old Malda	Aiho, Kachu Pukur, Kendua, Gazole, Chanchal, Kaliachak, Sujapur, Manikchak, Ratua, Harish Chandrapur, Bamongola, Habibpur	-	2
Murshidabad	Baharampur	–	Baharampur, Beldanga, Dhulian, Domkal, Jangipur, Jiaganj Azimganj, Kandi, Murshidabad	Anup Nagar, Aurangabad, Chachanda, Charka, Dafahat, Dhusaripara, Sagardighi, Farrakka Barrage Township, Fatellapur, Ghorsala, Goaljan, Gora Bazar, Harharia Chak, Jagtaj, Jot Kamal, Kankuria, Kasimbazar, Khodarampur, Paschim Punropara, Sahajadpur, Salar, Serpur, Srikantabati, Uttar Mahammadpur	-	8
Nadia	Krishnanagar	-	Birnagar, Chakdaha, Gayespur, Haringhata, Kalyani, Krishnanagar, Taherpur, Nabadwip, Ranaghat, Santipur, Cooper's Camp	Aistala, Bablari Dewanganj, Baruihuda, Char Brahmanagar, Char Maijdia, Darappur, Jagadanandapur, Karimpur, Kshidirpur, Madanpur, Badkulla, Nasra, Parbbatipur, Phulia, Satigachha	-	11
North 24 Parganas	Barasat	Bidhannagar	Ashoknagar Kalyangarh, Baduria, Bangaon, Baranagar, Barasat, Barrackpore, Basirhat, Bhatpara, Dum Dum, Gobardanga, Habra, Halisahar, Garulia, Kamarhati, Kanchrapara, Khardaha, Madhyamgram, Naihati, New Barrackpur, North Barrackpur, North Dumdum, Panihati, South Dumdum, Taki, Titagarh	Bamangachhi, Bara Bamonia, Chandpur, Dhakuria, Dhanyakuria, Garshyamnagar, Guma, Ichhapur Defence Estate, Jafarpur, Jetia, Kaugachhi, Maslandapur, Muragachha, Nebadhai Duttapukur, Nokpul, Patulia, Raigachhi, Ruiya, Sadpur, Sonatikiri, Talbandha, Thakurnagar	Barrackpur Cantonment, New Town	25
Paschim Bardhaman	Asansol	Asansol, Durgapur	-	Amkula, Andal, Bahula, Ballavpur, Banshra, Baska, Belebathan, Bhanowara, Bilpahari, Chak Bankola, Chapui, Chelad, Chhora, Chittaranjan, Dalurband, Debipur, Dhandadihi, Dignala, Haripur, Harishpur, Hindusthan Cables Town, Jemari, Jemari (J.K. Nagar Township), Kajora, Kanksa, Kenda, Kendra Khottamdi, Khandra, Konardihi, Kunustara, Mahira, Mandarbani, Murgathaul, Nabgram, Palashban, Pangachhiya (B), Parashkol, Parasia, Prayagpur, Raghunathchak, Ramnagar, Ratibati, Sankarpur, Sarpi, Siduli, Sirsha, Ukhra	-	-
Paschim Medinipur	Medinipur	-	Chandrakona, Ghatal, Kharagpur, Kharar, Khirpai, Medinipur, Ramjibanpur	Balichak, Deuli, Durllabhganj, Kharagpur Railway Settlement	-	7
Purba Bardhaman	Bardhaman	-	Bardhaman, Dainhat, Guskara, Kalna, Katwa, Memari	Dhatrigram, Gopinathpur, Hatsimla, Panuhat, Patuli, Srirampur, Sukdal, Uttar Goara	-	6
Purba Medinipur	Tamluk	-	Contai, Egra, Haldia, Panskura, Tamluk	Bahirgram, Dakshin Baguan, Goasafat, Kakdihi, Kolaghat	-	5
Purulia	Purulia	-	Jhalda, Purulia, Raghunathpur	Manbazar, Adra, Arra, Balarampur, Barabazar, Chapari, Hijuli, Nabagram, Par Beliya, Santaldih	-	3
South 24 Parganas	Alipore	-	Baruipur, Budge Budge, Diamond Harbour, Jaynagar Majilpur, Maheshtala, Pujali, Rajpur Sonarpur	Abhirampur, Alipur, Amtala, Asuti, Baharu, Balarampur, Barkalikapur, Basanti, Benjanhari Acharial, Bhangar Raghunathpur, Bhasa, Bidyadharpur, Bilandapur, Birlapur, Bishnupur, Bora Gagangohalia, Bowali, Buita, Chak Alampur, Chak Baria, Chak Enayetnagar, Chak Kashipur, Champahati, Chanddandaha, Chata Kalikapur, Dakshin Raypur, Danga, Daulatpur, Ganye Gangadharpur, Garia, Gaur Daha, Gobindapur, Hanspukuria, Hariharpur, Kalikapur, Kalikapur Barasat, Kalua, Kanganbaria, Kanyanagar, Khodar Bazar, Komarhat, Kriparampur, Magrahat, Mallikpur, Maricha, Mathurapur, Nadabhanga, Nahazari, Naridana, Nimpith, Nischintapur, Panchghara, Patharberia, Petua, Poali, Radhanagar, Ramchandrapur, Ramchandrapur, Rameswarpur, Ramkrishnapur, Raynagar, Sahebpur, Salipur, Samali, Solgohalia, Tulshighata, Uttar Durgapur, Uttar Kalas, Uttar Raypur, Uttarparanij	-	7
Uttar Dinajpur	Raiganj	-	Dalkhola, Islampur, Kaliaganj, Raiganj	Kas ba, Nachhratpur Katabari	-	4

== See also ==
- List of cities in West Bengal by population
- List of metropolitan area in West Bengal
