= Alipore Sadar subdivision =

Subdivision in West Bengal, India

Alipore Sadar
- Subdivision
- Location of Alipore Sadar subdivision in South 24 Parganas district
- Coordinates: 22.5391712°N 88.3272782°E
- Country: India
- State: West Bengal
- Division: Presidency
- District: South 24 Parganas
- Headquarters: Alipore

Government
  - CD Blocks: Thakurpukur Maheshtala, Budge Budge I, Budge Budge II, Bishnupur I, Bishnupur II
  - Lok Sabha constituencies: Diamond Harbour, Jadavpur, Kolkata Dakshin
  - Vidhan Sabha constituencies: Satgachhia, Bishnupur, Kasba, Jadavpur, Tollyganj, Behala Purba, Behala Paschim, Maheshtala, Budge Budge, Metiaburuz

Area
  - Total: 427.28 km^{2} (164.97 sq mi)

Population (2011)
  - Total: 1,490,342
  - Density: 3,488.0/km^{2} (9,033.8/sq mi)
  - Urban: 891,971

Demographics
  - Literacy: 81.14 per cent
  - Sex ratio: 956 ♂/♀

Languages
  - Official: Bengali
  - Additional official: English
- Time zone: UTC+05:30 (IST)
- Website: s24pgs.gov.in

Alipore Sadar subdivision is an administrative subdivision of South 24 Parganas district in the Indian state of West Bengal.

== Overview ==
Alipore Sadar subdivision is the most urbanized part of the South 24 Parganas district. 59.85% of the population lives in the urban areas and 40.15% lives in the rural areas. The entire district is situated in the Ganges Delta and the subdivision, on the east bank of the Hooghly River, is an alluvial stretch, with industrial development.

== Subdivisions ==

South 24 Parganas district is divided into five administrative subdivisions:

Subdivision	Headquarters	Area (km^{2})	Population (2011)	Urban population %	Rural Population %
Alipore Sadar	Alipore	427.43	1,490,342	59.85	40.15
Baruipur	Baruipur	1,355.44	2,396,643	31.05	68.95
Canning	Canning	1,103.73	1,140,562	12.37	87.63
Diamond Harbour	Diamond Harbour	1,264.68	2,125,758	14.61	85.39
Kakdwip	Kakdwip	1,389.93	1,008,653	0	100
South 24 Parganas	Alipore	9,960,00	8,161,961	25.58	74.42

18.26% of the total population of South 24 Parganas district live in Alipore Sadar subdivision.

== Administrative units ==
Alipore Sadar subdivision has 5 police stations, 5 community development blocks, 5 panchayat samitis, 43 gram panchayats, 268 mouzas, 243 inhabited villages, 3 municipalities and 36 census towns. The municipalities are at Maheshtala, Budge Budge and Pujali. The census towns are: Joka, Chata Kalikapur, Ganye Gangadharpur, Rameswarpur, Asuti, Hanspukuria, Kalua, Ramchandrapur, Samali, Uttar Raypur, Balarampur, Buita, Benjanhari Acharial (P), Abhirampur, Nischintapur, Birlapur, Chak Kashipur, Chak Alampur, Bowali, Dakshin Raypur, Poali, Daulatpur, Bhasa, Bishnupur, Kanyanagar, Nahazari, Nadabhanga, Kanganbaria, Bora Gagangohalia, Chanddandaha, Barkalikapur, Patharberia, Ramkrishnapur, Amtala, Kriparampur and Chak Enayetnagar.

=== Kolkata Urban Agglomeration ===
The following Municipalities and census towns in South 24 Parganas district were part of Kolkata Urban Agglomeration in the 2011 census: Maheshtala (M), Joka (CT), Balarampur (CT), Chata Kalikapur (CT), Budge Budge (M), Nischintapur (CT), Uttar Raypur (CT), Pujali (M) and Rajpur Sonarpur (M).

== Police stations ==
Police stations in Alipore Sadar subdivision have the following features and jurisdiction:

Police Station	Area covered (km^{2})	Border (km)	Municipal town/ city	CD Block
Maheshtala	53.137	-	Maheshtala	Thakurpukur Maheshtala
Rabindranagar	6	-	Maheshtala	Thakurpukur Maheshtala
Kalitala Ashuti	n/a	-	-	Thakurpukur Maheshtala
Budge Budge	49.61	-	Budge Budge	Budge Budge I
Pujali	n/a	-	Pujali	Budge Budge I
Nodakhali	78	-	-	Budge Budge II
Bishnupur	198	-	-	Bishnupur I, Bishnupur II

== CD Blocks ==

Community development blocks in Alipore Sadar subdivision are:

CD Block	Headquarters	Area (km^{2})	Population (2011)	SC %	ST %	Hindus %	Muslims %	Literacy rate %	Census Towns
Thakurpukur Maheshtala	Barisha	63.08	176,203	34.26	0.29	67.32	26.64	83.54	9
Budge Budge I	Purba Nischintapur	26.55	112,908	19.47	0.15	52.41	47.39	80.57	7
Budge Budge II	Dongaria	78.00	192,134	20.04	0.14	67.55	32.23	79.13	5
Bishnupur I	Bishnupur	116.36	232,365	46.66	0.04	63.46	31.04	78.21	4
Bishnupur II	Bakrahat	81.71	214,531	15.56	0.04	61.92	37.60	81.37	11

== Gram panchayats ==
The subdivision contains 43 gram panchayats under 5 community development blocks:

- Thakurpukur Maheshtala CD Block consists of four gram panchayats: Asuti-I, Asuti-II, Chatta and Rasapunja.
- Budge Budge I CD block consists of six gram panchayats: Buta, Chingripota, Mayapur, Nischintapur, Rajibpur and Uttar Raipur.
- Budge Budge II CD block consists of 11 gram panchayats: Burul, Chakmanik, Dongaria Raipur, Gaja Poyali, Kamrabad, Kasipur Alampur, Naskarpur, North Bawali, Rania, Satgachhia and South Bawali.
- Bishnupur I CD block consists of 11 gram panchayats: Amgachhia, Andhar Manik, Bhandaria Kastekumari, Dakshin Gauripur Chakdhir, Julpia, Keoradanga, Kulerdari, Panakua, Paschim Bishnupur, Purba Bishnupur and Raskhali.
- Bishnupur II CD block consists of 11 gram panchayats: Bakhrahat, Chak Enayetnagar, Chandi, Gobindapur Kalicharanpur, Kanganberia, Khagramuri, Maukhali, Nahajari, Panchanan, Patharberia Jaychandipur and Ramkrishnapur Borhanpur.

== Municipal towns/ cities ==
An overview of the municipal towns and cities in Alipore Sadar subdivision is given below:

Municipal town/ city	Area (km^{2})	Population (2011)	SC %	ST %	Hindus %	Muslims %	Literacy rate %
Maheshtala	44.18	448,317	12.19	0.43	57.95	41.11	82.03
Budge Budge	9.06	76,837	9.13	0.13	69.61	29.28	85.14
Pujali	8.32	37,047	14.79	2.53	58.54	41.20	78.80

== Economy ==
The Alipore Sadar subdivision includes Budge Budge, an old industrial town on the bank of the Hooghly, The jute industry, a major talking-point about the area has been facing labour unrest and sheer competition from jute mills in Bangladesh. A slightly older report by Shodganga mentions 9 jute mills in Budge Budge and 1 in Maheshtala. The MSME report mentions 6 jute mills and Budge Budge Municipality talks of four major jute mills – Budge Budge Jute Mill, Cheviot Jute Mill, Caledonian Jute Mill and New Central Jute Mill. Birla Jute Mill is at Birlapur. Such giants as Budge Budge and Allied Jute Exports Ltd have closed. India Linoleums Ltd. at Birlapur produces linoleum. Budge Budge has a number of oil storage units. Bata India opened its first shoe factory in 1934 at Batanagar.Budge Budge Thermal Power Station of CESC Limited has a generating capacity of 750 MW.

“The whole of the jute mill area in Bengal was located on the either side of the river Hooghly, in a radius of about 50 kilometer north and south of Calcutta from Bansberia in the north, to Budge Budge in the South,” said a report of the Vidyasagar University. It further said that although jute mill workers were earlier local people, subsequently migrants formed a sizeable section of the population, because “agriculture in Bengal was more remunerative than work in the jute mills but what the jute mills paid was enough to attract labour from Bihar, Orissa, UP, CP and even Tamilnadu”. Much the same happened in other industries of the period.

== Education ==
South 24 Parganas district had a literacy rate of 77.51% as per the provisional figures of the census of India 2011. Alipore Sadar subdivision had a literacy rate of 81.14%, Baruipur subdivision 77.45%, Canning subdivision 70.98%, Diamond Harbour subdivision 76.26% and Kakdwip subdivision 82.04%

Given in the table below (data in numbers) is a comprehensive picture of the education scenario in South 24 Parganas district, with data for the year 2013-14:

Subdivision	Primary School		Middle School		High School		Higher Secondary School		General College, Univ		Technical / Professional Instt		Non-formal Education	
Subdivision	Institution	Student	Institution	Student	Institution	Student	Institution	Student	Institution	Student	Institution	Student	Institution	Student
Alipore Sadar	531	53,719	34	4,455	50	16,471	91	66,813	5	8,122	6	3,094	1,379	53,429
Baruipur	883	132,649	65	8,954	50	26,443	128	129,195	8	27,657	7	6,735	3,116	138,507
Canning	532	81,697	59	9,181	29	10,515	55	57,921	4	5,490	1	n/a	2,105	96,622
Diamond Harbour	1,212	116,407	61	6,680	98	38,470	145	113,147	7	20,061	5	1,774	3,140	137,378
Kakdwip	598	53,058	45	5,654	48	20,383	82	56,192	3	5,420	1	100	1,844	78,897
South 24 Parganas district*	3,756	437,530	264	34,924	275	118,282	501	423,268	27	66,750	20	11,703	11,584	504,833

.* Does not include data for portions of South 24 Parganas district functioning under Kolkata Municipal Corporation

The following institutions are located in Alipore Sadar subdivision:

- Budge Budge College was established at Budge Budge in 1971.
- Budge Budge Institute of Technology was established at Nischintapur, Budge Budge in 2009. It offers, diploma, degree and post graduate courses.
- Maheshtala College was established at Maheshtala in 1971.
- Saheed Anurup Chandra Mahavidyalaya was established at Burul in 1991.
- Asutosh College Second Campus at Bhasa.
- Vidyanagar College was established at Vidyanagar in 1963.

== Healthcare ==
The table below (all data in numbers) presents an overview of the medical facilities available and patients treated in the hospitals, health centres and sub-centres in 2014 in South 24 Parganas district.

Subdivision	Health & Family Welfare Deptt, WB				Other State Govt Deptts	Local bodies	Central Govt Deptts / PSUs	NGO / Private Nursing Homes	Total	Total Number of Beds	Total Number of Doctors	Indoor Patients	Outdoor Patients
Subdivision	Hospitals	Rural Hospitals	Block Primary Health Centres	Primary Health Centres	Other State Govt Deptts	Local bodies	Central Govt Deptts / PSUs	NGO / Private Nursing Homes	Total	Total Number of Beds	Total Number of Doctors	Indoor Patients	Outdoor Patients
Alipore Sadar	-	3	3	7	1	3	-	48	65	1,159	199	33,498	633,233
Baruipur	1	6	1	18	-	2	-	66	94	1,045	201	48,114	1,266,244
Canning	1	3	1	6	-	-	-	15	26	351	49	22,467	666,377
Diamond Harbour	1	6	3	17	-	-	-	68	95	1077	169	65,051	1,325,535
Kakdwip	1	3	1	11	-	-	-	20	36	458	73	28,707	405,501
South 24 Parganas district	4	21	9	59	1	5	-	217	316	4,090	691	197,837	4,397,890

Note: The district data does not include data for portions of South 24 Parganas district functioning under Kolkata Municipal Corporation. The number of doctors exclude private bodies.

Medical facilities in Alipore Sadar subdivision are as follows:

Hospitals: (Name, location, beds)

- M. R. Bangur Hospital, Tollygunge, Kolkata, 620 beds
- Vidyasagar State General Hospital, Behala, Kolkata, 256 beds
- Baghajatin State General Hospital, Baghajatin, Kolkata, 100 beds
- Bijoygarh State General Hospital, Bijoygarh, Kolkata, 100 beds
- Garden Reach State General Hospital, Garden Reach, Kolkata, 68 beds
- A.T.Dhar Memorial Hospital, Budge Budge, 28 beds
- Budge Budge Municipal Hospital, Budge Budge, 28 beds
- Budge Budge ESI Hospital, Budge Budge, 300 beds
- Barisha Hospital, Barisha, Kolkata, KMC, 20 beds
- ESI Hospital and Occupational Health Centre, Joka, 143 beds

Rural Hospitals: (Name, CD block, location, beds)

- Amtala Rural Hospital, Bishnupur II CD block, Amtala, 50 beds
- Lakshmibala Dutta Rural Hospital, Budge Budge II CD block, PO Bakrahat, 30 beds
- Benjanhari Acharial Rural Hospital, Budge Budge I CD block, PO Buita, 30 beds

Block Primary Health Centres: (Name, CD block, location, beds)

- Chandidaulatabad Block Primary Health Centre, Bishnupur I CD block, PO Nepalganj, 10 beds
- Samali Block Primary Health Centre, Bishnupur II CD Block, Samali, PO Nahazari, 10 beds
- Sarsuna Block Primary Health Centre, Thakurpukur Mahestala CD block, Sarsuna, 15 beds

Primary Health Centres: (CD block-wise)(CD Block, PHC location, beds)

- Bishnupur I CD block: Julpia (PO Andharmanik) (6), Amgachhia (PO Nepalganj) (10)
- Bishnupur II CD block: Moukhali (PO Charshyamdas) (6)
- Budge Budge I CD block: Biraj Lakshmi (PO Pujali) (6), Jamalpur (6)
- Budge Budge II CD block: Burul (6), Gojapoali (PO Poali)(6)

There are primary health centres – Haridevpur (PO Paschim Putiary) (2) and Garfa (6)- located in Kolkata

== Electoral constituencies ==
Lok Sabha (parliamentary) and Vidhan Sabha (state assembly) constituencies in Alipore Sadar subdivision were as follows:

Lok Sabha	Reservation	Vidhan Sabha	Reservation	CD Block and/or Gram panchayats and/or municipal areas
Diamond Harbour	None	Satgachhia	None	Bishnupur II CD Block, and Burul, Chakmanik, Gaja Poyali, Kamrabad, Naskarpur, Rania and Satgachhia gram panchayats of Budge Budge II CD Block
Diamond Harbour	None	Bishnupur	SC	Bishnupur I CD Block and Thakurpukur Maheshtala CD Block
Diamond Harbour	None	Maheshtala	None	Ward Nos. 8, 11–35 of Maheshtala municipality
Diamond Harbour	None	Budge Budge	None	Budge Budge municipality, Pujali municipality, Budge Budge I CD Block, and Dongaria Raipur, Kasipur Alampur, North Bawali and South Bawali gram panchayats of Budge Budge II CD Block
Diamond Harbour	None	Metiaburuz	None	Ward Nos. 1–7, 9, 10 of Maheshtala municipality, and Ward Nos. 136–141 of Kolkata Municipal Corporation
Jadavpur	None	Jadavpur	None	Ward Nos. 96, 99, 101–106, 109, 110 of Kolkata Municipal Corporation
Jadavpur	None	Tollygunge	None	Ward Nos. 94, 95, 97, 98, 100, 111–114 of Kolkata Municipal Corporation
Kolkata Dakshin	None	Kasba	None	Ward Nos. 66, 67, 91, 92, 107, 108 of Kolkata Municipal Corporation
Kolkata Dakshin	None	Behala Purba	None	Ward Nos. 115–117, 120–124 and 142–144 of Kolkata Municipal Corporation
Kolkata Dakshin	None	Behala Paschim	None	Ward Nos. 118, 119, 125–132 of Kolkata Municipal Corporation
