= Birlapur =

- Census Town
- Location in West Bengal Location in India
- Coordinates: 22.4217°N 88.1560°E
- Country: India
- State: West Bengal
- District: South 24 Parganas
- CD Block: Budge Budge I

Area
  - Total: 4.84 km^{2} (1.87 sq mi)
- Elevation: 9 m (30 ft)

Population (2011)
  - Total: 22,078
  - Density: 4,560/km^{2} (11,800/sq mi)

Languages
  - Official: Bengali
  - Additional official: English
- Time zone: UTC+5:30 (IST)
- PIN: 743318
- Telephone code: +91 33
- Vehicle registration: WB-19 to WB-22, WB-95 to WB-99
- Lok Sabha constituency: Diamond Harbour
- Vidhan Sabha constituency: Budge Budge
- Website: www.s24pgs.gov.in

Birlapur is a census town within the jurisdiction of the Budge Budge police station in the Budge Budge I CD block in the Alipore Sadar subdivision of the South 24 Parganas district in the Indian state of West Bengal.

== History ==
Birlapur was founded by M.P. Birla. He established different factories here. It is famous for the Birla Jute Mill. There are one calcium carbide factory, one linoleum factory, one jute fibre factory and auto trim factory also. There is a co-educational high school named Birlapur Vidyalaya with both Hindi and Bengali medium. There is a permanent market also. The factory has its power house. Most of the employees stay in company provided quarters.

The township primary houses company workers ansld their families.

In the recent years, Birlapur has experienced a financial crisis as most of the factories are closing down. It needs an eye of a new investor to return to the prosperity it had in the 1990s.

== Geography ==
Cities and towns in the western part of Alipore Sadar subdivision (including Budge Budge I & II, Thakurpukur Maheshtala CD blocks) in South 24 Parganas district
M: municipal city/ town, CT: census town, R: rural/ urban centre,
Owing to space constraints in the small map, the actual locations in a larger map may vary slightly
Bakrahat is in Bishnupur II CD block, but Lakshmibala Rural Hospital at Bakrahat serves Budge Budge II CD block and so it is included here.

=== Area overview ===
Alipore Sadar subdivision is the most urbanized part of the South 24 Parganas district. 59.85% of the population lives in the urban areas and 40.15% lives in the rural areas. In the northern portion of the subdivision (shown in the map alongside) there are 21 census towns. The entire district is situated in the Ganges Delta and the subdivision, on the east bank of the Hooghly River, is an alluvial stretch, with industrial development.

Note: The map alongside presents some of the notable locations in the subdivision. All places marked in the map are linked in the larger full screen map.

=== Location ===
Birlapur is located at 22°25′18″N 88°09′22″E. It has an average elevation of 9 metres (30 ft).

== Demographics ==
According to the 2011 Census of India, Birlapur had a total population of 22,078, of which 11,542 (52%) were males and 10,536 (48%) were females. There are 3,004 people in the age range of 0 to 6 years. The total number of literate people was 14,829 (77.74% of the population over 6 years).

According to the 2001 Census of India, Birlapur had a population of 19,830. Males constitute 55% of the population and females 45%. It has an average literacy rate of 61%, higher than the national average of 59.5%; with male literacy of 68% and female literacy of 52%. 13% of the population is under 6 years of age.

== Infrastructure ==
According to the District Census Handbook 2011, Birlapur covered an area of 4.84 km^{2}. Budge Budge railway station is 12 km away. Among the civic amenities it had 28.5 km roads with both open and covered drains. The protected water supply involved over-head tank. It had 2,546 domestic electric connections and 18 road light points. Among the medical facilities it had a nursing home 2 km away and 1 medicine shop. Among the educational facilities it had were 24 primary schools, 1 middle school, 1 secondary school and 2 senior secondary schools. The nearest general degree college was at Budge Budge 10 km away. It had 4 shorthand, typewriting and vocational training centres. It had 7 non-formal education centres (Sarba Sikha Abhiyan). Among the social, cultural and recreational facilities it had 1 stadium.

== Transport ==
A short stretch of local roads link Birlapur to the Budge Budge Trunk Road.

Budge Budge railway station is located nearby.

== Healthcare ==
Benjanhari Acharial Rural Hospital, with 30 beds, at Benjanhari Acharial, is the major government medical facility in the Budge Budge I CD block.
