= Budge Budge I =

Community Development Block in West Bengal, India

- Community Development Block
- Location of Budge Budge I community development block in South 24 Parganas district
- Coordinates: 22.4827548°N 88.1817594°E
- Country: India
- State: West Bengal
- Division: Presidency
- District: South 24 Parganas
- Subdivision: Alipore Sadar
- Headquarters: Purba Nischintapur

Government
  - Gram Panchayats: Buta, Chingripota, Mayapur, Nischintapur, Rajibpur, Uttar Raipur
  - Lok Sabha constituencies: Diamond Harbour
  - Vidhan Sabha constituencies: Budge Budge

Area
  - Total: 26.55 km^{2} (10.25 sq mi)

Population (2011)
  - Total: 112,908
  - Density: 4,253/km^{2} (11,010/sq mi)
  - Urban: 83,335

Demographics
  - Literacy: 80.57 per cent
  - Sex ratio: 958 ♂/♀

Languages
  - Official: Bengali
  - Additional official: English
- Time zone: UTC+05:30 (IST)
- Website: s24pgs.gov.in

Budge Budge I is a community development block that forms an administrative division in Alipore Sadar subdivision of South 24 Parganas district in the Indian state of West Bengal.

== Geography ==

The Budge Budge I CD block is located at 22°28′58″N 88°10′54″E. It has an average elevation of 9 metres (30 ft).

The Budge Budge I CD block is bounded by the Sankrail CD block in the Howrah district, across the Hooghly, in the north, the Thakurpukur Maheshtala CD block in the east, the Budge Budge II CD block in the south, the Sankrail and Uluberia I CD blocks in the Howrah district, across the Hooghly, in the west.

The South 24 Parganas district is divided into two distinct physiographic zones: the marine-riverine delta in the north and the marine delta zone in the south. As the sea receded southwards, in the sub-recent geological period, a large low-lying plain got exposed. Both tidal inflows and the rivers have deposited sediments in this plain. The periodical collapse of both the natural levees and man-made embankments speed up the process of filling up depressions containing brackish water wetlands. The marine delta in the south is formed of interlacing tidal channels. As non-saline water for irrigation is scarce, agriculture is monsoon-dominated. Some parts of the wetlands are still preserved for raising fish.

The Budge Budge I CD block has an area of 26.55 km^{2}. It has 1 panchayat samity, 6 gram panchayats, 83 gram sansads (village councils), 16 mouzas and 13 inhabited villages, as per the District Statistical Handbook for South Twenty-four Parganas. Budge Budge and Pujali police stations serve this CD Block. Headquarters of this CD block is at Purba Nischintapur.

Gram panchayats of the Budge Budge I CD block/panchayat samiti are: Buta, Chingripota, Mayapur, Nischintapur, Rajibpur and Uttar Raipur.

== Demographics ==
=== Population ===
According to the 2011 Census of India, the Budge Budge I CD block had a total population of 112,908, of which 29,573 were rural and 83,335 were urban. There were 57,662 (51%) males and 55,246 (49%) females. There were 12,633 persons in the age range of 0 to 6 years. The Scheduled Castes numbered 21,983 (19.47%) and the Scheduled Tribes numbered 170 (0.15%).

According to the 2001 Census of India, the Budge Budge I CD block had a total population of 99,874, out of which 98,027 were males and 92,589 were females. The Budge Budge I CD Block registered a population growth of -16.38% during the 1991-2001 decade. Decadal growth for the South 24 Parganas district was 20.89%. Decadal growth in West Bengal was 17.84%. The Scheduled Castes at 23,829 formed around one-fourth the population. The Scheduled Tribes numbered 660.

Census Towns in the Budge Budge I CD block (2011 census figures in brackets): Uttar Raypur (23,084), Balarampur (5,251), Buita (16,764), Benjanhari Acharial (P) (5,187), Abhirampur (4,618), Nischintapur (6,353) and Birlapur (22,078).

Large village (with 4,000+ population) in the Budge Budge I CD block (2011 census figures in brackets): Jamalpur (4,857).

Other villages in the Budge Budge I CD block include (2011 census figures in brackets): Chingripota (3,003).

=== Literacy ===
According to the 2011 census, the total number of literate people in the Budge Budge I CD block was 80,787 (80.57% of the population over 6 years) out of which males numbered 43,572 (85.01% of the male population over 6 years) and females numbered 37,215 (75.92% of the female population over 6 years). The gender disparity (the difference between female and male literacy rates) was 9.09%.

According to the 2011 Census of India, literacy in the South 24 Parganas district was 77.51%. Literacy in West Bengal was 77.08% in 2011. Literacy in India in 2011 was 74.04%.

According to the 2001 Census of India, the Budge Budge I CD block had a total literacy of 73.98% for the 6+ age group. While male literacy was 81.36% female literacy was 64.82%. South 24 Parganas district had a total literacy of 69.45%, male literacy being 79.19% and female literacy being 59.01%.

See also – List of West Bengal districts ranked by literacy rate

Literacy in CD blocks of
South 24 Parganas district
Alipore Sadar subdivision
Bishnupur I – 78.33%
Bishnupur II – 81.37%
Budge Budge I – 80.57%
Budge Budge II – 79.13%
Thakurpukur Maheshtala – 83.54%
Baruipur subdivision
Baruipur – 76.46%
Bhangar I – 72.06%
Bhangar II – 74.49%
Jaynagar I – 73.17%
Jaynagar II – 69.71%
Kultali – 69.37%
Sonarpur – 79.70%
Canning subdivision
Basanti – 68.32%
Canning I – 70.76%
Canning II – 66.51%
Gosaba – 78.98%
Diamond Harbour subdivision
Diamond Harbour I – 75.72%
Diamond Harbour II – 76.91%
Falta – 77.17%
Kulpi – 75.49%
Magrahat I – 73.82%
Magrahat II – 77.41%
Mandirbazar – 75.89%
Mathurapur I – 73.93%
Mathurapur II – 77.77%
Kakdwip subdivision
Kakdwip – 77.93%
Namkhana – 85.72
Patharpratima – 82.11%
Sagar – 84.21%
Source: 2011 Census: CD Block Wise
Primary Census Abstract Data

=== Language ===
Languages of Budge Budge I CD block (2011)
1. Bengali (95.2%)
2. Hindi (4.54%)
3. Urdu (0.22%)
4. Others (0.01%)

At the time of the 2011 census, 95.23% of the population spoke Bengali, 4.54% Hindi and 0.22% Urdu as their first language.

=== Religion ===
Religion in Budge Budge I CD block (2011)
Hinduism	54.41%
Islam	45.39%
Other or not stated	0.20%

In the 2011 Census of India, Hindus numbered 63,174 and formed 54.41% of the population in Budge Budge I CD block. Muslims numbered 53,508 and formed 45.39% of the population. Others numbered 226 and formed 0.20% of the population. In 2001, Hindus were 55.69% of the population, while Muslims were 44.19% of the population.

The proportion of Hindus in South Twenty-four Parganas district has declined from 76.0% in 1961 to 63.2% in 2011. The proportion of Muslims in South Twenty-four Parganas district has increased from 23.4% to 35.6% during the same period. Christians formed 0.8% in 2011.

== Rural poverty ==
According to the Human Development Report for the South 24 Parganas district, published in 2009, in the Budge Budge I CD block the percentage of households below poverty line was 14.78%, a comparatively low poverty level. According to the rural household survey in 2005, the proportion of households in the South 24 Parganas with poverty rates below poverty line was 34.11%, way above the state and national poverty ratios. The poverty rates were very high in the Sundarbans settlements with all the thirteen CD blocks registering poverty ratios above 30% and eight CD blocks had more than 40% of the population in the BPL category.

== Economy ==
=== Livelihood ===
Livelihood
in Budge Budge I CD block
1. Cultivators (2.83%)
2. Agricultural labourers (11.8%)
3. Household industries (11.8%)
4. Other Workers (73.5%)

In the Budge Budge I CD block in 2011, among the class of total workers, cultivators numbered 1,140 and formed 2.83%, agricultural labourers numbered 4,762 and formed 11.81%, household industry workers numbered 4,772 and formed 11.83% and other workers numbered 29,656 and formed 73.53%. Total workers numbered 40,330 and formed 35.72% of the total population, and non-workers numbered 72,578 and formed 64.28% of the population.

The District Human Development Report points out that in the blocks of region situated in the close proximity of the Kolkata metropolis, overwhelming majority are involved in the non-agricultural sector for their livelihood. On the other hand, in the Sundarbans settlements, overwhelming majority are dependent on agriculture. In the intermediate region, there is again predominance of the non-agricultural sector. Though the region is not very close to Kolkata, many places are well connected and some industrial/ economic development has taken place.

Note: In the census records a person is considered a cultivator, if the person is engaged in cultivation/ supervision of land owned by self/government/institution. When a person who works on another person's land for wages in cash or kind or share, is regarded as an agricultural labourer. Household industry is defined as an industry conducted by one or more members of the family within the household or village, and one that does not qualify for registration as a factory under the Factories Act. Other workers are persons engaged in some economic activity other than cultivators, agricultural labourers and household workers. It includes factory, mining, plantation, transport and office workers, those engaged in business and commerce, teachers, entertainment artistes and so on.

=== Infrastructure ===
There are 13 inhabited villages in the Budge Budge I CD block, as per the District Census Handbook, South Twenty-four Parganas, 2011. 100% villages have power supply. 13 villages (100%) have drinking water supply. 1 village (7.69%) has a post office. 13 villages (100%) have telephones (including landlines, public call offices and mobile phones). 7 villages (53.85%) have pucca (paved) approach roads and 1 village (7.69%) has transport communication (includes bus service, rail facility and navigable waterways).

=== Agriculture ===
The South 24 Parganas had played a significant role in the Tebhaga movement launched by the Communist Party of India in 1946. Subsequently, Operation Barga was aimed at securing tenancy rights for the peasants. In the Budge Budge I CD Block 231.18 acres of land was acquired and vested. Out of this 15.06 acres or 6.5% of the vested land was distributed. The total number of patta (document) holders was 83.

According to the District Human Development Report, agriculture is an important source of livelihood in the South Twentyfour Parganas district. The amount of cultivable land per agricultural worker is only 0.41 hectare in the district. Moreover, the irrigation facilities have not been extended to a satisfactory scale. Agriculture mostly remains a mono-cropped activity.

According to the District Census Handbook, the saline soil of the district is unfit for cultivation, but the non-salty lands are very fertile. While rice is the main food crop, jute is the main cash crop.

In 2013–14, there were 10 fertiliser depots, 8 seed stores and 26 fair price shops in the Budge Budge I CD block.

In 2013–14, Budge Budge I CD block produced 3,020 tonnes of Aman paddy, the main winter crop from 1,493 hectares, 1,044 tonnes of Boro paddy (spring crop) from 233 hectares.

=== Pisciculture ===
In the Budge Budge I CD block, in 2013–14, net area under effective pisciculture was 135 hectares, engaging 2,450 persons in the profession, and with an approximate annual production of 30,070 quintals.

Pisciculture is an important source of employment in the South 24 Parganas district. As of 2001, more than 4.5 lakh people were engaged in Pisciculture. Out of this 2.57 lakhs were from the 13 blocks in the Sundarbans settlements.

=== Banking ===
In 2013–14, the Budge Budge I CD block had offices of 12 commercial banks.

=== Backward Regions Grant Fund ===
The South 24 Parganas district is listed as a backward region and receives financial support from the Backward Regions Grant Fund. The fund, created by the Government of India, is designed to redress regional imbalances in development. As of 2012, 272 districts across the country were listed under this scheme. The list includes 11 districts of West Bengal.

== Transport ==
Budge Budge I CD block has 1 originating/ terminating bus routes.

Santoshpur, Akra, Nangi and Budge Budge are stations on the Sealdah South section.

== Education ==
In 2013–14, the Budge Budge I CD block had 41 primary schools with 3,323 students, 5 middle schools with 182 students, 2 high schools with 460 students and 10 higher secondary schools with 6,750 students. The Budge Budge I CD block had 1 technical/ professional institution with 948 students and 262 institutions for special and non-formal education with 11,170 students.

See also – Education in India

According to the 2011 census, in the Budge Budge I CD block, among the 13 inhabited villages, 1 village did not have a school, 6 villages had two or more primary schools, 5 villages had at least 1 primary and 1 middle school and 3 villages had at least 1 middle and 1 secondary school.

Budge Budge Institute of Technology was established at Nischintapur, Budge Budge in 2009. It offers, diploma, degree and post-graduate courses.

== Healthcare ==
In 2014, the Budge Budge I CD block had 1 rural hospital, 2 primary health centres and 3 private nursing homes with total 56 beds and 7 doctors (excluding private bodies). It had 14 family welfare subcentres. 2,748 patients were treated indoor and 154,088 patients were treated outdoor in the hospitals, health centres and subcentres of the CD block.

According to the 2011 census, in the Budge Budge I CD block, 1 villages had a primary health centre, 10 villages had primary health subcentres, 7 villages had medicine shops and out of the 13 inhabited villages 1 village had no medical facilities.

Benjanhari Acharial Rural Hospital at Benjanhari Acharial with 30 beds is the major government medical facility in the Budge Budge I CD block. There are primary health centres at Biraj Lakshmi (PO Pujali) (with 6 beds) and Jamalpur (with 6 beds).
