= Uttar Raypur =

- Census Town
- Location in West Bengal Location in India
- Coordinates: 22.4698°N 88.1999°E
- Country: India
- State: West Bengal
- District: South 24 Parganas
- CD block: Budge Budge I

Area
  - Total: 5.32 km^{2} (2.05 sq mi)
- Elevation: 9 m (30 ft)

Population (2011)
  - Total: 23,084
  - Density: 4,340/km^{2} (11,200/sq mi)

Languages
  - Official: Bengali
  - Additional official: English
- Time zone: UTC+5:30 (IST)
- PIN: 743389
- Telephone code: +91 33
- Vehicle registration: WB-19 to WB-22, WB-95 to WB-99
- Lok Sabha constituency: Diamond Harbour
- Vidhan Sabha constituency: Budge Budge
- Website: www.s24pgs.gov.in

Uttar Raypur is a census town and a gram panchayat within the jurisdiction of the Budge Budge police station in the Budge Budge I CD block in the Alipore Sadar subdivision of the South 24 Parganas district in the Indian state of West Bengal.

== Geography ==
Cities and towns in the western part of Alipore Sadar subdivision (including Budge Budge I & II, Thakurpukur Maheshtala CD blocks) in South 24 Parganas district
M: municipal city/ town, CT: census town, R: rural/ urban centre,
Owing to space constraints in the small map, the actual locations in a larger map may vary slightly
Bakrahat is in Bishnupur II CD block, but Lakshmibala Rural Hospital at Bakrahat serves Budge Budge II CD block and so it is included here.

=== Area overview ===
Alipore Sadar subdivision is the most urbanized part of the South 24 Parganas district. 59.85% of the population lives in the urban areas and 40.15% lives in the rural areas. In the northern portion of the subdivision (shown in the map alongside) there are 21 census towns. The entire district is situated in the Ganges Delta and the subdivision, on the east bank of the Hooghly River, is an alluvial stretch, with industrial development.

Note: The map alongside presents some of the notable locations in the subdivision. All places marked in the map are linked in the larger full screen map.

=== Location ===
Uttar Raypur is located at 22°28′11″N 88°12′00″E. It has an average elevation of 9 metres (30 ft).

Balarampur, Uttar Raypur, Buita, Benjanhari Acharial, Abhirampur and Nischintapur form a cluster of census towns around Budge Budge and Pujali, as per the map of the Budge Budge I CD block on page 167 of the District Census Handbook 2011 for the South 24 Parganas.

== Demographics ==
According to the 2011 Census of India, Uttar Raypur had a total population of 23,084, of which 11,762 (51%) were males and 11,322 (49%) were females. There were 2,310 people in the age range 0–6 years. The total number of literate people was 17,522 (84.35% of the population over 6 years).

According to the 2001 Census of India, Uttar Raypur had a population of 20,382. Males constitute 52% of the population and females 48%. It has an average literacy rate of 70%, higher than the national average of 59.5%: male literacy is 76%, and female literacy is 65%. 12% of the population is under 6 years of age.

=== Kolkata Urban Agglomeration ===
The following municipalities and census towns in the South 24 Parganas district were part of the Kolkata Urban Agglomeration in the 2011 census: Maheshtala (M), Joka (CT), Balarampur (CT), Chata Kalikapur (CT), Budge Budge (M), Nischintapur (CT), Uttar Raypur (CT), Pujali (M) and Rajpur Sonarpur (M).

== Infrastructure ==
As per the District Census Handbook 2011, Uttar Raypur covered an area of 5.32 km^{2}. Budge Budge railway station is 1 km away. Among the civic amenities it had 10 km of roads. Protected water supply involves hand pumps. It had 1,200 domestic electric connections and 105 road lights. Among the medical facilities it had were 5 medicine shops. Among the educational facilities It had were 12 primary schools, 3 secondary schools, 2 senior secondary schools. It had 2 non-formal education centres (Sarbya Siksha Abhiyan). It had the branch of 1 nationalised bank.

== Transport ==
Uttar Raypur is on the Budge Budge Trunk Road.

Budge Budge railway station is located nearby.

== Education ==
Nayachak High School is a Bengali-medium coeducational institution established in 1961. It has arrangements for teaching from class v to class XII.

== Healthcare ==
Benjanhari Acharial Rural Hospital, with 30 beds, at Benjanhari Acharial, is the major government medical facility in the Budge Budge I CD block.
