= Buita =

- Census Town
- Location in West Bengal Location in India
- Coordinates: 22.4521°N 88.1853°E
- Country: India
- State: West Bengal
- District: South 24 Parganas
- CD block: Budge Budge I

Area
  - Total: 0.86 km^{2} (0.33 sq mi)
- Elevation: 9 m (30 ft)

Population (2011)
  - Total: 16,764
  - Density: 19,000/km^{2} (50,000/sq mi)

Languages
  - Official: Bengali
  - Additional official: English
- Time zone: UTC+5:30 (IST)
- PIN: 700137
- Telephone code: +91 33
- Vehicle registration: WB-19 to WB-22, WB-95 to WB-99
- Lok Sabha constituency: Diamond Harbour
- Vidhan Sabha constituency: Budge Budge
- Website: www.s24pgs.gov.in

Buita is a census town and a gram panchayat within the jurisdiction of the Budge Budge police station in the Budge Budge I CD block in the Alipore Sadar subdivision of the South 24 Parganas district in the Indian state of West Bengal.

== Geography ==
Cities and towns in the western part of Alipore Sadar subdivision (including Budge Budge I & II, Thakurpukur Maheshtala CD blocks) in South 24 Parganas district
M: municipal city/ town, CT: census town, R: rural/ urban centre,
Owing to space constraints in the small map, the actual locations in a larger map may vary slightly
Bakrahat is in Bishnupur II CD block, but Lakshmibala Rural Hospital at Bakrahat serves Budge Budge II CD block and so it is included here.

=== Area overview ===
Alipore Sadar subdivision is the most urbanized part of the South 24 Parganas district. 59.85% of the population lives in the urban areas and 40.15% lives in the rural areas. In the northern portion of the subdivision (shown in the map alongside) there are 21 census towns. The entire district is situated in the Ganges Delta and the subdivision, on the east bank of the Hooghly River, is an alluvial stretch, with industrial development.

Note: The map alongside presents some of the notable locations in the subdivision. All places marked in the map are linked in the larger full screen map.

=== Location ===
Buita is located at 22°27′08″N 88°11′07″E. It has an average elevation of 9 metres (30 ft).

Balarampur, Uttar Raypur, Buita, Benjanhari Acharial, Abhirampur and Nischintapur form a cluster of census towns around Budge Budge and Pujali, as per the map of the Budge Budge I CD block on page 167 of the District Census Handbook 2011 for the South 24 Parganas.

== Demographics ==
According to the 2011 Census of India, Buita had a total population of 16,764, of which 8,486 (51%) were males and 8,278 (49%) were females. There were 1983 people in the age range of 0 to 6 years. The total number of literate people was 11,422 (77.27% of the population over 6 years).

== Infrastructure ==
According to the District Census Handbook 2011, Buita covered an area of 0.8571 km^{2}. Budge Budge railway station is 8 km away. Among the civic amenities it had 22.5 km of roads. Protected water supply involved tap water from treated source and hand pumps. It had 2,000 domestic electric connections. Among the medical facilities it had were a nursing home 4 km away and 1 medicine shop. Among the educational facilities it had were 6 primary schools and 3 middle schools. The nearest general degree college was at Budge Budge 8 km away. It had 7 non-formal education centres (Sarba Siksha Abhiyan). Important commodities it manufactured were: zari items and ready-made garments. It had the branch of 1 nationalised bank.

== Transport ==
A short stretch of local roads link Buita to the Budge Budge Trunk Road.

Budge Budge railway station is located nearby.

== Education ==
Bethuabati Bhajahari High School is a Bengali-medium coeducational institution, established in 1948. It has arrangements for teaching from class V to class X.

Shanpukur High School is a Bengali-medium coeducational school established in 1961. It has facilities for teaching from class VI to class XII.

== Healthcare ==
Benjanhari Acharial Rural Hospital, with 30 beds, at Benjanhari Acharial, is the major government medical facility in the Budge Budge I CD block.
