= Benjanhari Acharial =

- Census Town
- Location in West Bengal Location in India
- Coordinates: 22.4656°N 88.1744°E
- Country: India
- State: West Bengal
- District: South 24 Parganas
- CD block: Budge Budge I

Area
  - Total: 1.07 km^{2} (0.41 sq mi)
- Elevation: 9 m (30 ft)

Population (2011)
  - Total: 5,187
  - Density: 4,850/km^{2} (12,600/sq mi)

Languages
  - Official: Bengali
  - Additional official: English
- Time zone: UTC+5:30 (IST)
- PIN: 700137
- Telephone code: +91 33
- Vehicle registration: WB-19 to WB-22, WB-95 to WB-99
- Lok Sabha constituency: Diamond Harbour
- Vidhan Sabha constituency: Budge Budge
- Website: www.s24pgs.gov.in

Benjanhari Acharial is a census town within the jurisdiction of the Budge Budge police station in the Budge Budge I CD block in the Alipore Sadar subdivision of the South 24 Parganas district in the Indian state of West Bengal.

== Geography ==
Cities and towns in the western part of Alipore Sadar subdivision (including Budge Budge I & II, Thakurpukur Maheshtala CD blocks) in South 24 Parganas district
M: municipal city/ town, CT: census town, R: rural/ urban centre,
Owing to space constraints in the small map, the actual locations in a larger map may vary slightly
Bakrahat is in Bishnupur II CD block, but Lakshmibala Rural Hospital at Bakrahat serves Budge Budge II CD block and so it is included here.

=== Area overview ===
Alipore Sadar subdivision is the most urbanized part of the South 24 Parganas district. 59.85% of the population lives in the urban areas and 40.15% lives in the rural areas. In the northern portion of the subdivision (shown in the map alongside) there are 21 census towns. The entire district is situated in the Ganges Delta and the subdivision, on the east bank of the Hooghly River, is an alluvial stretch, with industrial development.

Note: The map alongside presents some of the notable locations in the subdivision. All places marked in the map are linked in the larger full screen map.

=== Location ===
Benjanhari Acharial is located at 22°27′56″N 88°10′28″E. It has an average elevation of 9 metres (30 ft).

Balarampur, Uttar Raypur, Buita, Benjanhari Acharial, Abhirampur and Nischintapur form a cluster of census towns around Budge Budge and Pujali, as per the map of the Budge Budge I CD block on page 167 of the District Census Handbook 2011 for the South 24 Parganas.

== Demographics ==
According to the 2011 Census of India, Benjanhar Acharial had a total population of 5,187, of which 2,609 (50%) were males and 2,578 (50%) were females. There were 489 people in the age range of 0 to 6 years. The total number of literate people was 3,720 (79.18% of the population over 6 years).

== Infrastructure ==
According to the District Census Handbook 2011, Benjanhari Acharial covered an area of 1.0712 km^{2}. Budge Budge railway station is 6 km away. Among the civic amenities it had protected water supply involving hand pumps. It had 1,200 domestic electric connections. Among the medical facilities it had a nursing home 4 km away and 1 medicine shop. Among the educational facilities it had 1 primary school, 1 high school and 1 senior secondary school. The nearest general degree college was at Budge Budge 4 km away.

== Transport ==
A short stretch of local roads link Benjanhari Acharial to the Budge Budge Trunk Road.

Budge Budge railway station is located nearby.

== Education ==
Khariberia Vivekananda Vidyapith is a Bengali-medium boys only institution established in 1960. It has facilities for teaching from class V to class XII.

Badamtala High School is a Bengali-medium coeducational institution established in 1973. It has facilities for teaching from class VI to class XII.

Kalipur High School is a Bengali-medium boys only institution established in 1919. It has facilities for teaching from class V to class XII.

Kalipur Girls High School is a Bengali-medium girls only institution establishedin 1946. It has facilities for teaching from class V to class XII.

== Healthcare ==
Benjanhari Acharial Rural Hospital, with 30 beds, at Benjanhari Acharial, is the major government medical facility in the Budge Budge I CD block.
