= Balarampur, Budge Budge =

Balarampur
- Census Town
- Location in West Bengal Location in India
- Coordinates: 22.4744°N 88.2142°E
- Country: India
- State: West Bengal
- District: South 24 Parganas
- CD block: Budge Budge I

Area
  - Total: 1.43 km^{2} (0.55 sq mi)
- Elevation: 9 m (30 ft)

Population (2011)
  - Total: 5,251
  - Density: 3,670/km^{2} (9,510/sq mi)

Languages
  - Official: Bengali
  - Additional official: English
- Time zone: UTC+5:30 (IST)
- PIN: 743318
- Telephone code: +91 33
- Vehicle registration: WB-19 to WB-22, WB-95 to WB-99
- Lok Sabha constituency: Diamond Harbour
- Vidhan Sabha constituency: Budge Budge
- Website: www.s24pgs.gov.in

Balarampur is a census town in the Budge Budge I CD block in the Alipore Sadar subdivision of the South 24 Parganas district.

== Geography ==
Cities and towns in the western part of Alipore Sadar subdivision (including Budge Budge I & II, Thakurpukur Maheshtala CD blocks) in South 24 Parganas district
M: municipal city/ town, CT: census town, R: rural/ urban centre,
Owing to space constraints in the small map, the actual locations in a larger map may vary slightly
Bakrahat is in Bishnupur II CD block, but Lakshmibala Rural Hospital at Bakrahat serves Budge Budge II CD block and so it is included here.

=== Area overview ===
Alipore Sadar subdivision is the most urbanized part of the South 24 Parganas district. 59.85% of the population lives in the urban areas and 40.15% lives in the rural areas. In the northern portion of the subdivision (shown in the map alongside) there are 21 census towns. The entire district is situated in the Ganges Delta and the subdivision, on the east bank of the Hooghly River, is an alluvial stretch, with industrial development.

Note: The map alongside presents some of the notable locations in the subdivision. All places marked in the map are linked in the larger full screen map.

=== Location ===
Balarampur is located at 22.4744°N 88.2142°E. It has an average elevation of 9 metres (30 ft).

Balarampur, Uttar Raypur, Buita, Benjanhari Acharial, Abhirampur and Nischintapur form a cluster of census towns around Budge Budge and Pujali, as per the map of the Budge Budge I CD block on page 167 of the District Census Handbook 2011 for the South 24 Parganas.

== Demographics ==
According to the 2011 Census of India, Balarampur had a total population of 5,251, of which 2,689 (51%) were males and 2,562 (49%) were females. There were 524 people in the age range 0–6 years. The total number of literates was 3,755 (79.44% of the population over 6 years).

According to the 2001 Census of India, Balarampur had a population of 4,710. Males constitute 51% of the population and females 49%. It has an average literacy rate of 64%, higher than the national average of 59.5%; with 56% of the males and 44% of females literate. 13% of the population is under 6 years of age.

=== Kolkata Urban Agglomeration ===
The following municipalities and census towns in the South 24 Parganas district were part of the Kolkata Urban Agglomeration in the 2011 census: Maheshtala (M), Joka (CT), Balarampur (CT), Chata Kalikapur (CT), Budge Budge (M), Nischintapur (CT), Uttar Raypur (CT), Pujali (M) and Rajpur Sonarpur (M).

== Infrastructure ==
According to the District Census Handbook 2011, Balarampur covered an area of 1.43 km^{2}. Nangi railway station is 2 km away. Among the civic amenities it had 8 km of roads. Protected water supply involves hand pumps. It had 491 domestic electric connections. Among the medical facilities it had were 2 dispensaries/ health centre and 3 medicine shops. Among the educational facilities it had were 3 primary schools, 1 middle school, the nearest secondary school and senior secondary school were at Uttar Raypur 1.5 km away. The nearest general degree college was at Budge Budge 8 km away. It had the branch of 1 nationalised bank.

== Transport ==
Balarampur is on the Budge Budge Trunk Road.

Nangi railway station is located nearby.

== Education ==
Nandrampur Balarampur Junior High School is a Bengali-medium coeducational institution established in 2009. It has facilities for teaching from class V to class VIII.

Happy Home English School is an English-medium coeducational institution established in 2009. It has facilities for teaching from class I to class X.

Maheshtala High School is a Bengali-medium coeducational institution established in 1858. It has facilities for teaching from class V to class XII.

== Healthcare ==
Benjanhari Acharial Rural Hospital, with 30 beds, at Benjanhari Acharial, is the major government medical facility in the Budge Budge I CD block.
