= Ashok Kumar Deb =

Indian politician

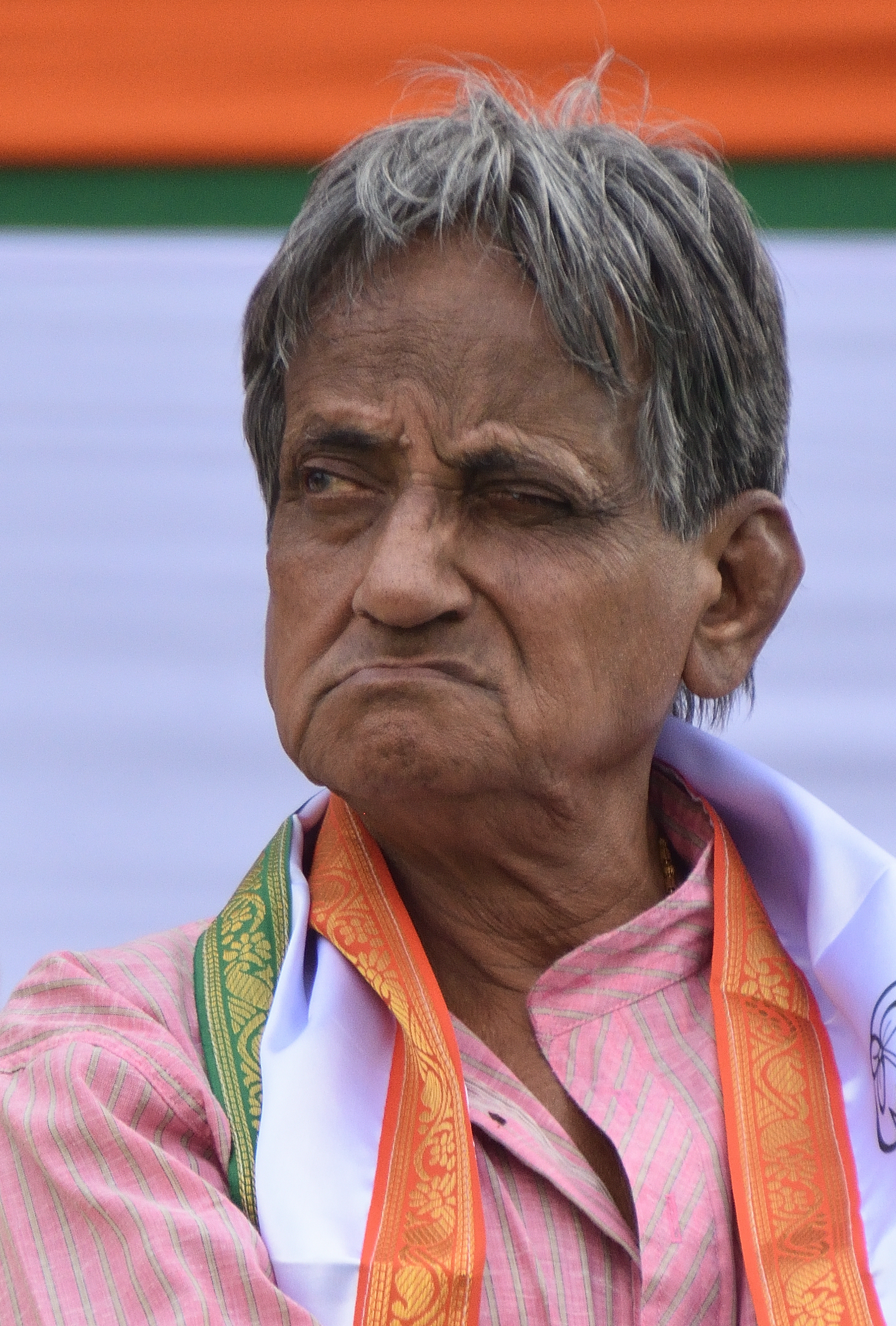
- Ashok Kumar Deb in March 2023

Member of West Bengal Legislative Assembly
- Incumbent
- Assumed office 1996
- Preceded by: Dipak Mukherjee
- Constituency: Budge Budge

Personal details
- Born: March 31, 1949 (age 77)
- Party: Trinamool Congress (1998– (until 2026); Democratic Trinamool Congress (from 2026); Indian National Congress (until 1998)
- Profession: Politician

Ashok Kumar Deb is an Indian politician and member of Trinamool Congress. He is an MLA, elected from the Budge Budge constituency in the 1996 West Bengal Legislative Assembly election. In the 2001, 2006, 2011, 2016, 2021 and 2026 assembly election he was re-elected from the same constituency.
