= Pujali =

City in West Bengal, India

- City
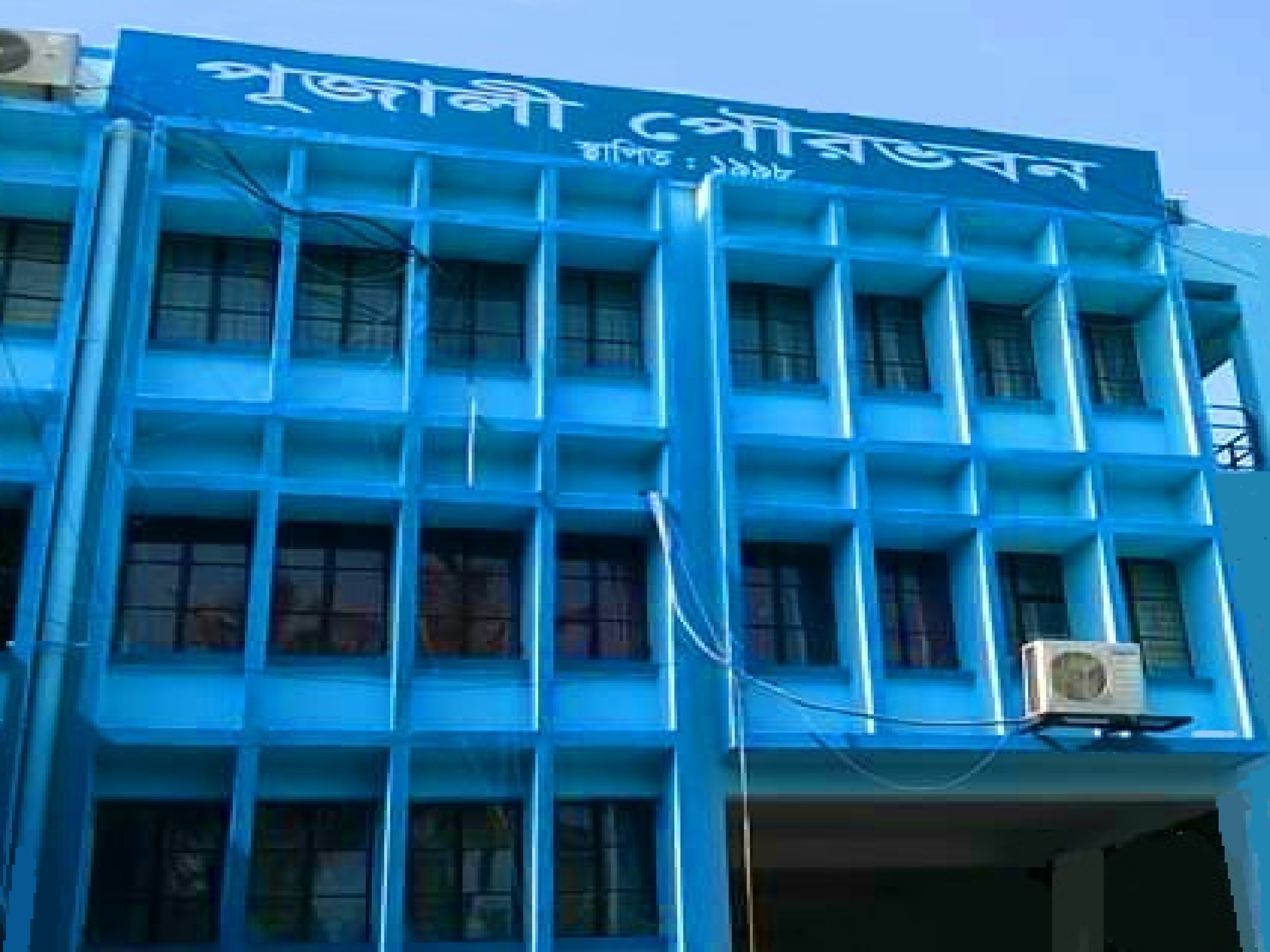
- Pujali Municipality
- Interactive map outlining Pujali
- Location in West Bengal Location in India Location in Asia Location in Earth
- Coordinates: 22°27′36″N 88°08′02″E
- Country: India
- State: West Bengal
- Division: Presidency
- District: South 24 Parganas

Government
  - Type: Municipality
  - Body: Pujali Municipality

Area
  - Total: 8.32 km^{2} (3.21 sq mi)
- Elevation: 8 m (26 ft)

Population (2011)
  - Total: 37,047
  - Density: 4,450/km^{2} (11,500/sq mi)

Demographics
  - Literacy: 78.80 per cent
  - Sex ratio: 956 ♂/♀

Languages
  - Official: Bengali
  - Additional official: English
- Time zone: UTC+5:30 (IST)
- PIN: 700138
- Telephone code: +91 33
- Vehicle registration: WB-19, WB-20, WB-95, WB-96, WB-97, WB-98
- Lok Sabha constituency: Diamond Harbour
- Vidhan Sabha constituency: Budge Budge
- Website: pujalimunicipality.in

Pujali (Bengali: [puːd͡ʒɑːlɪ]) is a city and a municipality of South 24 Parganas district in the Indian state of West Bengal. It is a part of the area covered by Kolkata Metropolitan Development Authority (KMDA).

== Geography ==
Cities and towns in the western part of Alipore Sadar subdivision (including Budge Budge I & II, Thakurpukur Maheshtala CD blocks) in South 24 Parganas district
M: municipal city/ town, CT: census town, R: rural/ urban centre,
Owing to space constraints in the small map, the actual locations in a larger map may vary slightly
Bakrahat is in Bishnupur II CD block, but Lakshmibala Rural Hospital at Bakrahat serves Budge Budge II CD block and so it is included here.

=== Area overview ===
Alipore Sadar subdivision is the most urbanized part of the South 24 Parganas district. 59.85% of the population lives in the urban areas and 40.15% lives in the rural areas. In the northern portion of the subdivision (shown in the map alongside) there are 21 census towns. The entire district is situated in the Ganges Delta and the subdivision, on the east bank of the Hooghly River, is an alluvial stretch, with industrial development

Note: The map alongside presents some of the notable locations in the subdivision. All places marked in the map are linked in the larger full screen map.

=== Location ===
Pujali is located at 22°27′36″N 88°08′02″E. It has an average elevation of 8 metres (26 ft).

Balarampur, Uttar Raypur, Buita, Benjanhari Acharial, Abhirampur and Nischintapur form a cluster of census towns around Budge Budge and Pujali, as per the map of the Budge Budge I CD block on the page number 167 in the District Census Handbook 2011 for the South 24 Parganas district.

=== Climate ===
Köppen-Geiger climate classification system classifies its climate as tropical wet and dry (Aw).

Climate data for Pujali
Month	Jan	Feb	Mar	Apr	May	Jun	Jul	Aug	Sep	Oct	Nov	Dec	Year
Mean daily maximum °C (°F)	25.4 (77.7)	27.7 (81.9)	31.4 (88.5)	33.1 (91.6)	33.4 (92.1)	32.3 (90.1)	30.7 (87.3)	30.8 (87.4)	31.2 (88.2)	30.8 (87.4)	28.1 (82.6)	25.1 (77.2)	30.0 (86.0)
Daily mean °C (°F)	19.9 (67.8)	22.7 (72.9)	27 (81)	29.3 (84.7)	30 (86)	29.5 (85.1)	28.5 (83.3)	28.6 (83.5)	28.5 (83.3)	27.5 (81.5)	23.5 (74.3)	20 (68)	26.3 (79.3)
Mean daily minimum °C (°F)	14.5 (58.1)	17.7 (63.9)	22.6 (72.7)	25.6 (78.1)	26.7 (80.1)	26.8 (80.2)	26.4 (79.5)	26.4 (79.5)	25.9 (78.6)	24.2 (75.6)	19 (66)	14.6 (58.3)	22.5 (72.6)
Average precipitation mm (inches)	14 (0.6)	17 (0.7)	20 (0.8)	34 (1.3)	96 (3.8)	244 (9.6)	323 (12.7)	322 (12.7)	321 (12.6)	172 (6.8)	30 (1.2)	1 (0.0)	1,594 (62.8)
Source: World Weather Online (altitude: 8 m)

== Demographics ==
=== Population ===
Historical population
Year	Pop.	±%
1991	10,112	—
2001	33,858	+234.8%
2011	37,047	+9.4%
Source: Census of India

According to the 2011 Census of India, Pujali had a total population of 37,047, of which 18,940 (51.12%) were males and 18,107 (48.88%) were females. It had a population density of 4,453 inhabitants per square kilometre (11,530/sq mi) with a sex ratio of 956 females for every 1000 males. There were 4,316 persons in the age range of 0 to 6 years which is 11.65% of the total population. The Scheduled Castes numbered 5,480 (14.79%) and the Scheduled Tribes numbered 937 (2.53%). The total number of literate persons was 25,791 (78.80% of the population over 6 years) out of which males numbered 13,827 (82.59% of the male population over 6 years) and females numbered 11,964 (74.82% of the female population over 6 years). Pujali had a total of 8,587 households as per report released by 2011 Census of India.

=== Language ===
Languages of Pujali (2011)
1. Bengali (98.2%)
2. Hindi (1.79%)
3. Urdu (0.02%)
4. Others (0.01%)

At the time of the 2011 Census of India, 98.18% of the population spoke Bengali, 1.79% Hindi and 0.02% Urdu as their first language.

=== Religion ===
Religion in Pujali (2011)
Religion	Percent
Hinduism	58.54%
Islam	41.20%
Christianity	0.16%
Sikhism	0.01%
Buddhism	0.02%
Jainism	0.01%
Others or not stated	0.05%

According to the 2011 Census of India, 58.54% of the population is Hindu, 41.20% Muslim, 0.16% Christian, 0.01% Sikh, 0.02% Buddhist and 0.01% Jain. 0.05% did not state a religion in the census.

== Civic administration ==
=== Municipality ===
Pujali Municipality covers an area of 8.32 km^{2} (3.21 sq mi). It has jurisdiction over the entire city of Pujali. The municipality was established in 1996; 30 years ago. It is divided into 15 administrative wards. According to the 2022 municipal election, it is being controlled by the All India Trinamool Congress.

=== Police station ===
Pujali police station has jurisdiction over parts of the Pujali Municipality, and the Budge Budge I CD block.

=== CD block HQ ===
The headquarters of the Budge Budge I CD block are located at Purba Nischintapur. The map of the CD block Budge Budge I on the page number 167 in the District Census Handbook 2011 for the South 24 Parganas district shows the headquarters of the CD block as being in Pujali.

== Transport ==
Pujali is on the Budge Budge Trunk Road.

Budge Budge railway station is located nearby.

== Healthcare ==
There is a primary health centre, with 6 beds, at Biraj Lakshmi (PO Pujali).
