= Kalua, Maheshtala =

Kalua
- Census Town
- Location in West Bengal Location in India
- Coordinates: 22.4541°N 88.3124°E
- Country: India
- State: West Bengal
- District: South 24 Parganas
- CD block: Thakurpukur Maheshtala

Area
  - Total: 1.80 km^{2} (0.69 sq mi)
- Elevation: 9 m (30 ft)

Population (2011)
  - Total: 15,735
  - Density: 8,740/km^{2} (22,600/sq mi)

Languages
  - Official: Bengali
  - Additional official: English
- Time zone: UTC+5:30 (IST)
- PIN: 700104
- Telephone code: +91 33
- Vehicle registration: WB-19 to WB-22, WB-95 to WB-99
- Lok Sabha constituency: Diamond Harbour
- Vidhan Sabha constituency: Bishnupur (SC)
- Website: www.s24pgs.gov.in

Kalua is a census town in the Thakurpukur Maheshtala CD block in the Alipore Sadar subdivision of the South 24 Parganas district in the Indian state of West Bengal.

== Geography ==
Kalua is located at 22°27′15″N 88°18′45″E. It has an average elevation of 9 metres (30 ft).

Hanspukuria, Joka, Kalua and Ramchandrapur form a cluster of census towns bordering areas of Kolkata Municipal Corporation, as per map of Thakurpukur Maheshtala CD block on page 153 of District Census Handbook 2011 for South 24 Parganas. Since publication of this map Joka I and Joka II gram panchayats have been added to Kolkata Municipal Corporation area.

== Demographics ==
As per the 2011 Census of India, Kalua had a total population of 15,735, of which 7,715 (49%) were males and 8,020 (51%) were females. Population below 6 years was 1,312. The total number of literates in Kalua was 12,665 (87.81% of the population over 6 years).

== Infrastructure ==
As per the District Census Handbook 2011, Kalua covered an area of 1.8009 km^{2}. Majerhat railway station is 8 km away. Among the civic amenities it had, the source of protected water supply was service reservoir and borewell tank. It had 3,000 domestic electric connections and 15 road light points. Among the medical facilities it had were a hospital 1 km away, a dispensary/ health centre 1 km away, a nursing home 3 km away and 8 medicine shops. Among the educational facilities It had were 4 primary schools, the nearest middle school, secondary school, senior secondary school were at Joka 2 km away and the nearest general degree college was at Thakurpukur 3 km away. It had 1 recognised typewriting, shorthand and vocational training institute. Among the social, cultural and recreational facilities, the nearest cinema theatre, auditoriums/ community halls, library and reading room were available at Behala 2 km away. Among the important commodities manufactured were grills and chowmein.

== Transport ==
Kalua is on the National Highway 12.

Majerhat railway station is located nearby.

== Healthcare ==
Sarsuna Block Primary Health Centre, with 15 beds, at Sarsuna, is the major government medical facility in the Thakurpukur Maheshtala CD block.
