= Ramchandrapur, Maheshtala =

Ramchandrapur
- Census Town
- Location in West Bengal Location in India
- Coordinates: 22.4610°N 88.3301°E
- Country: India
- State: West Bengal
- District: South 24 Parganas
- CD block: Thakurpukur Maheshtala

Area
  - Total: 1.32 km^{2} (0.51 sq mi)
- Elevation: 9 m (30 ft)

Population (2011)
  - Total: 6,252
  - Density: 4,740/km^{2} (12,300/sq mi)

Languages
  - Official: Bengali
  - Additional official: English
- Time zone: UTC+5:30 (IST)
- PIN: 700104
- Telephone code: +91 33
- Vehicle registration: WB-19 to WB-22, WB-95 to WB-99
- Lok Sabha constituency: Diamond Harbour
- Vidhan Sabha constituency: Bishnupur (SC)
- Website: www.s24pgs.gov.in

Ramchandrapur is a census town within the jurisdiction of the Maheshtala police station in the Thakurpukur Maheshtala CD block in the Alipore Sadar subdivision of the South 24 Parganas district in the Indian state of West Bengal.

== Geography ==
Ramchandrapur is located at 22°27′40″N 88°19′48″E. It has an average elevation of 9 metres (30 ft).

Hanspukuria, Joka, Kalua and Ramchandrapur form a cluster of census towns bordering areas of Kolkata Municipal Corporation, as per map of Thakurpukur Maheshtala CD block on page 153 of District Census Handbook 2011 for South 24 Parganas. Since publication of this map Joka I and Joka II gram panchayats have been added to Kolkata Municipal Corporation area.

== Demographics ==
As per the 2011 Census of India, Ramchandrapur had a total population of 6,252, of which 3,191 (51%) were males and 3,061 (49%) were females. Population below 6 years was 567. The total number of literates in Kalua was 5,081 (89.38% of the population over 6 years).

== Infrastructure ==
As per the District Census Handbook 2011, Ramchandrapur covered an area of 1.3193 km^{2}. Majerhat railway station is 8 km away. Among the civic amenities it had 1 km of roads with open drains. The source of protected water supply was service reservoir and borewell tank. It had 915 domestic electric connections and 50 road lights. Among the medical facilities it had were a dispensary/ health centre close by and 2 medicine shops. Among the educational facilities It had were 1 primary school, the nearest middle school, secondary school were at Korapukur 1 km away, senior secondary school was at Joka 3 km away and the nearest general degree college was at Thakurpukur 4 km away. It had 1 special school for the disabled. Among the important commodities manufactured were grills.

== Transport ==
A short stretch of local roads link Ramchandrapur to the National Highway 12.

Majerhat railway station is located nearby.

== Healthcare ==
Sarsuna Block Primary Health Centre, with 15 beds, at Sarsuna, is the major government medical facility in the Thakurpukur Maheshtala CD block.
