= Hanspukuria =

- Village
- Location in West Bengal Location in India
- Coordinates: 22.4479°N 88.2903°E
- Country: India
- State: West Bengal
- District: South 24 Parganas
- CD block: Thakurpukur Maheshtala

Area
  - Total: 1.62 km^{2} (0.63 sq mi)
- Elevation: 9 m (30 ft)

Population (2011)
  - Total: 3,887
  - Density: 2,400/km^{2} (6,210/sq mi)

Languages
  - Official: Bengali
  - Additional official: English
- Time zone: UTC+5:30 (IST)
- PIN: 700104
- Telephone code: +91 33
- Vehicle registration: WB-19 to WB-22, WB-95 to WB-99
- Lok Sabha constituency: Diamond Harbour
- Vidhan Sabha constituency: Bishnupur (SC)
- Website: www.s24pgs.gov.in

Hanspukuria is a Village the Thakurpukur Maheshtala CD block in the Alipore Sadar subdivision of the South 24 Parganas district in the Indian state of West Bengal.

== Geography ==
Cities and towns in the western part of Alipore Sadar subdivision (including Budge Budge I & II, Thakurpukur Maheshtala CD blocks) in South 24 Parganas district
M: municipal city/ town, CT: census town, R: rural/ urban centre,
Owing to space constraints in the small map, the actual locations in a larger map may vary slightly
Bakrahat is in Bishnupur II CD block, but Lakshmibala Rural Hospital at Bakrahat serves Budge Budge II CD block and so it is included here.

=== Area overview ===
Alipore Sadar subdivision is the most urbanized part of the South 24 Parganas district. 59.85% of the population lives in the urban areas and 40.15% lives in the rural areas. In the northern portion of the subdivision (shown in the map alongside) there are 21 census towns. The entire district is situated in the Ganges Delta and the subdivision, on the east bank of the Hooghly River, is an alluvial stretch, with industrial development.

Note: The map alongside presents some of the notable locations in the subdivision. All places marked in the map are linked in the larger full screen map.

=== Location ===
Hanspukuria is located at 22°26′52″N 88°17′25″E. It has an average elevation of 9 metres (30 ft).

Hanspukuria, Joka, Kalua and Ramchandrapur form a cluster of census towns bordering areas of Kolkata Municipal Corporation, as per map of Thakurpukur Maheshtala CD block on page 153 of District Census Handbook 2011 for South 24 Parganas. Since publication of this map Joka I and Joka II gram panchayats have been added to Kolkata Municipal Corporation area.

== Demographics ==
According to the 2011 Census of India, Hanspukuria had a total population of 3,887, of which 1,888 (49%) were males and 1,999 (51%) were females. There were 317 persons in the age range of 0 to 6 years. The total number of literate people in Hanspukuria was 3,127 (87.59% of the population over 6 years).

== Infrastructure ==
According to the District Census Handbook 2011, Hanspukuria covered an area of 1.6228 km^{2}. Majerhat railway station is 8 km away. Among the civic amenities it had 3 km of roads with open drains. The source of protected water supply was borewell tank and overhead tank. It had 815 domestic electric connections and 96 road light points. Among the medical facilities it had were a hospital 1 km away, a charitable hospital/nursing home 1 km away and 20 medicine shops. Among the educational facilities it had were 3 primary schools, 3 middle schools, 3 secondary schools, 3 senior secondary schools and the nearest general degree college was at Thakurpukur 2.5 km away. It had 1 management institute/ college and had 1 recognised typewriting, shorthand and vocational training institute. Among the social, recreational and cultural facilities, it had 2 auditoriums/ community halls. The nearest cinema theatre was at Khanbena 3 km away. Three commodities produced were x-ray films, fabricated items and chemicals.

== Transport ==
Hanspukuria is on the National Highway 12.

Majerhat railway station is located nearby.

== Education ==
Vivekananda Mission School is an English-medium institution affiliated with the Council for the Indian School Certificate Examinations. It prepares students for the ICSE/ ISC examinations.

St. Gregorius School is a Bengali-medium coeducational institution. It has facilities for teaching from class I to class VIII.

== Healthcare ==
Sarsuna Block Primary Health Centre, with 15 beds, at Sarsuna, is the major government medical facility in the Thakurpukur Maheshtala CD block.
