= Nahazari =

- Census Town
- Location in West Bengal Location in India
- Coordinates: 22.4347°N 88.2487°E
- Country: India
- State: West Bengal
- District: South 24 Parganas
- CD block: Bishnupur II

Area
  - Total: 6.58 km^{2} (2.54 sq mi)
- Elevation: 9 m (30 ft)

Population (2011)
  - Total: 17,422
  - Density: 2,650/km^{2} (6,860/sq mi)

Languages
  - Official: Bengali
  - Additional official: English
- Time zone: UTC+5:30 (IST)
- PIN: 700104
- Telephone code: +91 33
- Vehicle registration: WB-19 to WB-22, WB-95 to WB-99
- Lok Sabha constituency: Diamond Harbour
- Vidhan Sabha constituency: Satgachhia
- Website: www.s24pgs.gov.in

Nahazari is a census town and a gram panchayat within the jurisdiction of the Bishnupur police station in the Bishnupur II CD block in the Alipore Sadar subdivision of the South 24 Parganas district in the Indian state of West Bengal.

== Geography ==
Cities and towns in the eastern part of Alipore Sadar subdivision (including Bishnupur I & II CD blocks) in South 24 Parganas district
M: municipal city/ town, CT: census town, R: rural/ urban centre, N: neighbourhood
Owing to space constraints in the small map, the actual locations in a larger map may vary slightly

=== Area overview ===
The Alipore Sadar subdivision is the most urbanized part of the South 24 Parganas district. 59.85% of the population lives in the urban areas and 40.15% lives in the rural areas. In the southern portion of the subdivision (shown in the map alongside) there are 15 census towns. The entire district is situated in the Ganges Delta and the subdivision, on the east bank of the Hooghly River, is an alluvial stretch, with industrial development.

Note: The map alongside presents some of the notable locations in the subdivision. All places marked in the map are linked in the larger full screen map.

=== Location ===
Nahazari is located at 22°26′05″N 88°14′55″E. It has an average elevation of 9 metres (30 ft).

== Demographics ==
According to the 2011 Census of India, Nahazari had a total population of 17,422, of which 8809 (51%) were males and 8,613 (49%) were females. There were 2,423 persons in the age range of 0 to 6 years. The total number of literate persons in Nahazari was 10,693 (71.29% of the population over 6 years).

== Infrastructure ==
According to the District Census Handbook 2011, Nahazari covered an area of 6.5772 km^{2}. Among the civic amenities, it had 16 km roads with open drains, the protected water supply involved over-head tank and service reservoir. It had 1,507 domestic electric connections. Among the medical facilities it had 1 hospital, 2 dispensaries/ health centres. Among the educational facilities it had were 6 primary schools, 1 middle school, 1 secondary school, the nearest senior secondary school at Raspunja, 5 km away. Three important commodities it produced were paddy, sunflower, vegetables.

== Transport ==
A short stretch of local roads link Nahazari to the National Highway 12.

== Education ==
Nahazari Muslimpara Junior High School is a Bengali-medium coeducational institution established in 2010. It has facilities for teaching from class VI to class VII.

== Healthcare ==
There is a primary health centre, with 10 beds, at Samali (PO Nahazari).
