= Samali =

Samali samali
- Census Town
- Location in West Bengal Location in India
- Coordinates: 22.4171°N 88.2633°E
- Country: India
- State: West Bengal
- District: South 24 Parganas
- CD block: Thakurpukur Maheshtala

Area
  - Total: 2.15 km^{2} (0.83 sq mi)
- Elevation: 9 m (30 ft)

Population (2011)
  - Total: 7,180
  - Density: 3,340/km^{2} (8,650/sq mi)

Languages
  - Official: Bengali
  - Additional official: English
- Time zone: UTC+5:30 (IST)
- PIN: 700104
- Telephone code: +91 33
- Vehicle registration: WB-19 to WB-22, WB-95 to WB-99
- Lok Sabha constituency: Diamond Harbour
- Vidhan Sabha constituency: Bishnupur (SC)
- Website: www.s24pgs.gov.in

Samali is a census town within the jurisdiction of the Maheshtala police station in the Thakurpukur Maheshtala CD block in the Alipore Sadar subdivision of the South 24 Parganas district in the Indian state of West Bengal.

== Geography ==
Cities and towns in the western part of Alipore Sadar subdivision (including Budge Budge I & II, Thakurpukur Maheshtala CD blocks) in South 24 Parganas district
M: municipal city/ town, CT: census town, R: rural/ urban centre,
Owing to space constraints in the small map, the actual locations in a larger map may vary slightly
Bakrahat is in Bishnupur II CD block, but Lakshmibala Rural Hospital at Bakrahat serves Budge Budge II CD block and so it is included here.

=== Area overview ===
Alipore Sadar subdivision is the most urbanized part of the South 24 Parganas district. 59.85% of the population lives in the urban areas and 40.15% lives in the rural areas. In the northern portion of the subdivision (shown in the map alongside) there are 21 census towns. The entire district is situated in the Ganges Delta and the subdivision, on the east bank of the Hooghly River, is an alluvial stretch, with industrial development.

Note: The map alongside presents some of the notable locations in the subdivision. All places marked in the map are linked in the larger full screen map.

=== Location ===
Samali is located at 22°25′02″N 88°15′48″E. It has an average elevation of 9 metres (30 ft).

== Demographics ==
According to the 2011 Census of India, Samali had a total population of 7,180, of which 3,630 (51%) were males and 3,550 (49%) were females. There were 856 persons in the age range of 0 to 6 years. The total number of literate persons in Samali was 4,939 (78.10% of the population over 6 years).

== Infrastructure ==
According to the District Census Handbook 2011, Samali covered an area of 2.1548 km^{2}. Majerhat railway station is 10 km away. Among the civic amenities it had 9.5 km of roads with open drains. Protected water supply involved overhead tanks and hand pumps. It had 1,857 domestic electric connections. Among the medical facilities it had were a dispensary/ health centre, a hospital 1 km away and 4 medicine shops. Among the educational facilities it had were 3 primary schools, the nearest middle school at Nahazari close by, secondary school and senior secondary school at Rasapunja nearby and the nearest general degree college at Thakurpukur 7 km away. It had 1 engineering college. Among the social, recreational and cultural facilities, it had 2 orphanage homes and 1 old age home. Three most important commodities it manufactured were jeans, thermal items and zari work.

== Transport ==
Samali is on the National Highway 12.

Majerhat railway station is located nearby.

== Education ==
Samali Bholanath High School is a Bengali-medium coeducational institution established in 1947. It has arrangements for teaching from class VI to class X.

== Healthcare ==
There is a primary health centre, with 10 beds, at Samali (PO Nahazari).
