= Bhasa, Bishnupur =

Bhasa
- Census Town
- Location in West Bengal Location in India
- Coordinates: 22.4145°N 88.2838°E
- Country: India
- State: West Bengal
- District: South 24 Parganas
- CD block: Bishnupur I

Area
  - Total: 2.24 km^{2} (0.86 sq mi)
- Elevation: 9 m (30 ft)

Population (2011)
  - Total: 5,559
  - Density: 2,480/km^{2} (6,430/sq mi)

Languages
  - Official: Bengali
  - Additional official: English
- Time zone: UTC+5:30 (IST)
- PIN: 700104
- Telephone code: +91 33
- Vehicle registration: WB-19 to WB-22, WB-95 to WB-99
- Lok Sabha constituency: Diamond Harbour
- Vidhan Sabha constituency: Bishnupur (SC)
- Website: www.s24pgs.gov.in

Bhasa is a census town within the jurisdiction of the Bishnupur police station in the Bishnupur I CD block in the Alipore Sadar subdivision of the South 24 Parganas district in the Indian state of West Bengal.

== Geography ==
Cities and towns in the eastern part of Alipore Sadar subdivision (including Bishnupur I & II CD blocks) in South 24 Parganas district
M: municipal city/ town, CT: census town, R: rural/ urban centre, N: neighbourhood
Owing to space constraints in the small map, the actual locations in a larger map may vary slightly

=== Area overview ===
The Alipore Sadar subdivision is the most urbanized part of the South 24 Parganas district. 59.85% of the population lives in the urban areas and 40.15% lives in the rural areas. In the southern portion of the subdivision (shown in the map alongside) there are 15 census towns. The entire district is situated in the Ganges Delta and the subdivision, on the east bank of the Hooghly River, is an alluvial stretch, with industrial development.

Note: The map alongside presents some of the notable locations in the subdivision. All places marked in the map are linked in the larger full screen map.

=== Location ===
Bhasa is located at 22°24′52″N 88°17′02″E. It has an average elevation of 9 metres (30 ft).

== Demographics ==
According to the 2011 census of India, Bhasa had a total population of 5,559, of which 2,888 (52%) were males and 2,671 (48%) were females. There were 697 persons in the age range of 0 to 6 years. The total number of literate persons was 3,726 (76.64% of the population over 6 years).

== Infrastructure ==
According to the District Census Handbook 2011, Bhasa covered an area of 2.2407 km^{2}. Among the civic amenities, the protected water supply involved over-head tank and service reservoir. It had 1,400 domestic electric connections. Among the medical facilities it had 1 dispensary/ health centre, 1 family welfare centre and 2 medicine shops. Among the educational facilities it had were 3 primary schools, 1 middle school, 1 secondary school, the nearest senior secondary school at Bishnupur 1 km away, a general degree college at Vidyanagar located close by. Three important commodities it produced were biri, umbrella and garments. It had the branch of 1 nationalised bank.

== Economy ==
Paharpur Cooling Towers, the world’s largest manufacturers of process cooling equipment, has its corporate headquarters on the Diamond Harbour Road. It exports its products to 50 countries.

== Transport ==
Bhasa is on the National Highway 12.

== Education ==
Asutosh College Second Campus is at Bhasa.

== Culture ==
BAPS Shri Swaminarayan Mandir was opened to the public in 2014. It is on the Diamond Harbour Road at Bhasa.

== Healthcare ==
Chandi Doulatabad Block Primary Health Centre, with 10 beds, at Doulatabad (PO Nepalganj), is the major government medical facility in the Bishnupur I CD block.
