= Budge Budge =

City in West Bengal, India

- City
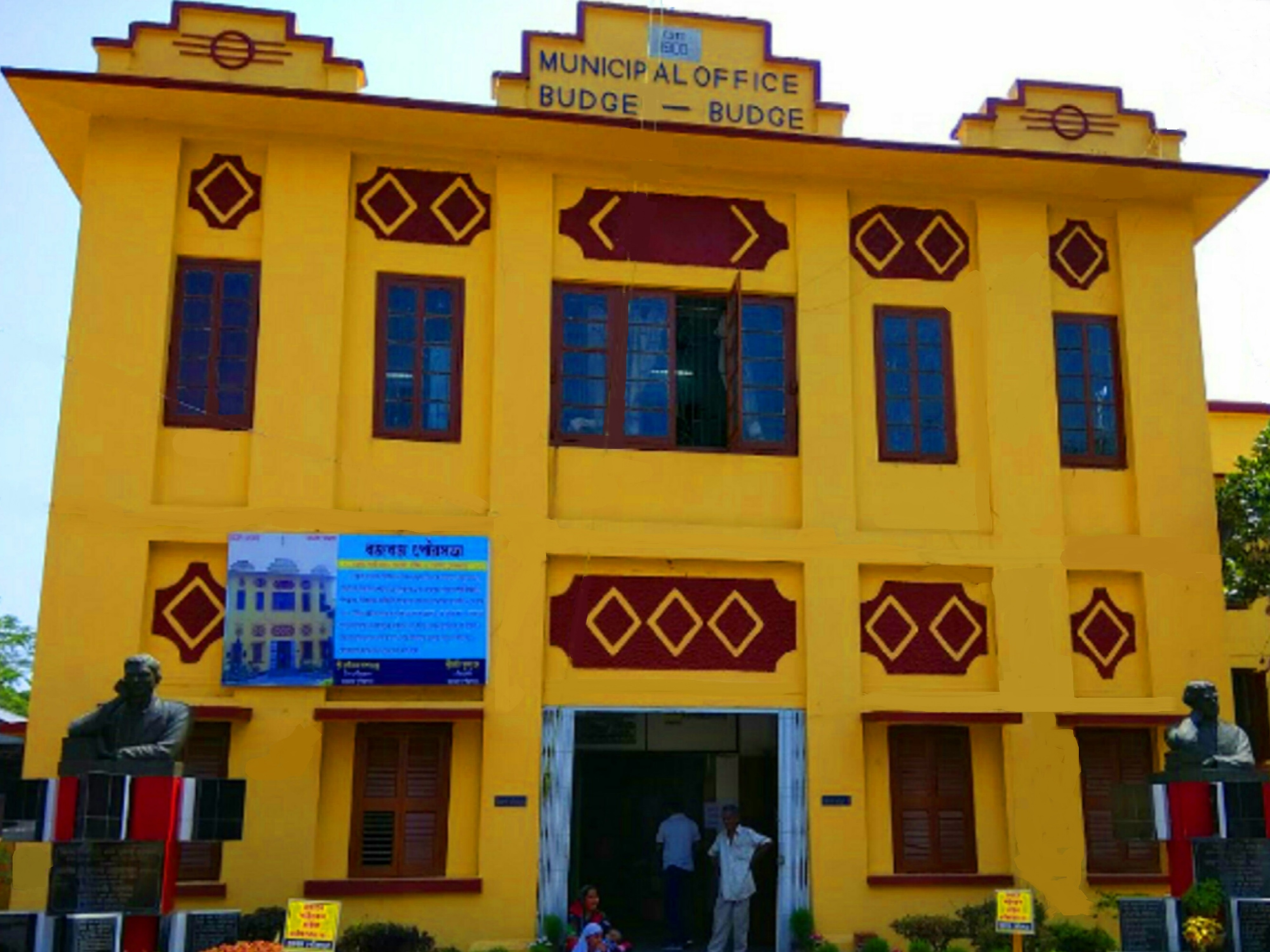
- Budge Budge Municipality
- Interactive map of Budge Budge
- Location in West Bengal Location in India
- Coordinates: 22°28′25″N 88°10′26″E
- Country: India
- State: West Bengal
- Division: Presidency
- District: South 24 Parganas

Government
  - Type: Municipality
  - Body: Budge Budge Municipality

Area
  - Total: 9.06 km^{2} (3.50 sq mi)
- Elevation: 7 m (23 ft)

Population (2011)
  - Total: 76,837
  - Density: 8,480/km^{2} (22,000/sq mi)

Demographics
  - Literacy: 85.14 per cent
  - Sex ratio: 945 ♂/♀

Languages
  - Official: Bengali
  - Additional official: English
- Time zone: UTC+5:30 (IST)
- PIN: 700137
- Telephone code: +91 33
- Vehicle registration: WB-19, WB-20, WB-95, WB-96, WB-97, WB-98
- Lok Sabha constituency: Diamond Harbour
- Vidhan Sabha constituency: Budge Budge
- Website: www.budgebudgemunicipality.org

Budge Budge (Bengali: [bɔd͡ʒbɔd͡ʒ]) is a city and a municipality of South 24 Parganas district in the Indian state of West Bengal. It is a part of the area covered by Kolkata Metropolitan Development Authority (KMDA).

== Geography ==
Cities and towns in the western part of Alipore Sadar subdivision (including Budge Budge I & II, Thakurpukur Maheshtala CD blocks) in South 24 Parganas district
M: municipal city/ town, CT: census town, R: rural/ urban centre,
Owing to space constraints in the small map, the actual locations in a larger map may vary slightly
Bakrahat is in Bishnupur II CD block, but Lakshmibala Rural Hospital at Bakrahat serves Budge Budge II CD block and so it is included here.

=== Area overview ===
Alipore Sadar subdivision is the most urbanized part of the South 24 Parganas district. 59.85% of the population lives in the urban areas and 40.15% lives in the rural areas. In the northern portion of the subdivision (shown in the map alongside) there are 21 census towns. The entire district is situated in the Ganges Delta and the subdivision, on the east bank of the Hooghly River, is an alluvial stretch, with industrial development.

Note: The map alongside presents some of the notable locations in the subdivision. All places marked in the map are linked in the larger full screen map.

=== Location ===
Budge Budge is located at 22°28′25″N 88°10′26″E. It has an average elevation of 7 metres (23 ft).

Balarampur, Uttar Raypur, Buita, Benjanhari Acharial, Abhirampur and Nischintapur form a cluster of census towns around Budge Budge and Pujali, as per the map of the Budge Budge I CD block on the page number 167 in the District Census Handbook 2011 for the South 24 Parganas district.

=== Climate ===
Köppen-Geiger climate classification system classifies its climate as tropical wet and dry (Aw).

Climate data for Budge Budge
Month	Jan	Feb	Mar	Apr	May	Jun	Jul	Aug	Sep	Oct	Nov	Dec	Year
Mean daily maximum °C (°F)	25.4 (77.7)	27.7 (81.9)	31.4 (88.5)	33.1 (91.6)	33.4 (92.1)	32.3 (90.1)	30.7 (87.3)	30.8 (87.4)	31.2 (88.2)	30.8 (87.4)	28.1 (82.6)	25.1 (77.2)	30.0 (86.0)
Daily mean °C (°F)	19.9 (67.8)	22.7 (72.9)	27 (81)	29.3 (84.7)	30 (86)	29.5 (85.1)	28.5 (83.3)	28.6 (83.5)	28.5 (83.3)	27.5 (81.5)	23.5 (74.3)	20 (68)	26.3 (79.3)
Mean daily minimum °C (°F)	14.5 (58.1)	17.7 (63.9)	22.6 (72.7)	25.6 (78.1)	26.7 (80.1)	26.8 (80.2)	26.4 (79.5)	26.4 (79.5)	25.9 (78.6)	24.2 (75.6)	19 (66)	14.6 (58.3)	22.5 (72.6)
Average precipitation mm (inches)	14 (0.6)	17 (0.7)	20 (0.8)	34 (1.3)	96 (3.8)	244 (9.6)	323 (12.7)	322 (12.7)	321 (12.6)	172 (6.8)	30 (1.2)	1 (0.0)	1,594 (62.8)
Source: Climate-Data.org (altitude: 7 m)

== Demographics ==
=== Population ===
Historical population
Year	Pop.	±%
1901	13,051	—
1911	17,982	+37.8%
1921	25,723	+43.0%
1931	24,183	−6.0%
1941	32,394	+34.0%
1951	32,196	−0.6%
1961	39,824	+23.7%
1971	51,039	+28.2%
1981	70,404	+37.9%
1991	77,575	+10.2%
2001	81,554	+5.1%
2011	76,837	−5.8%
Source: Census of India

According to the 2011 Census of India, Budge Budge had a total population of 76,837, of which 39,510 (51.42%) were males and 37,327 (48.58%) were females. It had a population density of 8,481 inhabitants per square kilometre (21,970/sq mi) with a sex ratio of 945 females for every 1000 males. There were 6,946 persons in the age range of 0 to 6 years which is 9.04% of the total population. The Scheduled Castes numbered 7,015 (9.13%) and the Scheduled Tribes numbered 103 (0.13%). The total number of literate persons was 59,504 (85.14% of the population over 6 years) out of which males numbered 32,078 (89.05% of the male population over 6 years) and females numbered 27,426 (80.97% of the female population over 6 years). Budge Budge had a total of 18,055 households as per report released by 2011 Census of India.

=== Language ===
Languages of Budge Budge (2011)
1. Bengali (95.2%)
2. Hindi (4.54%)
3. Urdu (0.22%)
4. Others (0.01%)

At the time of the 2011 Census of India, 95.23% of the population spoke Bengali, 4.54% Hindi and 0.22% Urdu as their first language.

=== Religion ===
Religion in Budge Budge (2011)
Religion	Percent
Hinduism	69.61%
Islam	29.28%
Christianity	0.49%
Sikhism	0.40%
Buddhism	0.02%
Jainism	0.04%
Others or not stated	0.16%

According to the 2011 Census of India, 69.61% of the population is Hindu, 29.28% Muslim, 0.49% Christian, 0.40% Sikh, 0.02% Buddhist and 0.04% Jain. 0.16% did not state a religion in the census.

== Civic administration ==
=== Municipality ===
Budge Budge Municipality covers an area of 9.06 km^{2} (3.50 sq mi). It has jurisdiction over the entire city of Budge Budge. The municipality was established in 1900; 126 years ago. It is divided into 20 administrative wards. Since the 2022 municipal election, it is being controlled by the All India Trinamool Congress.

=== Police station ===
Budge Budge police station covers an area of 49.61 km^{2} (19.15 sq mi). It has jurisdiction over parts of the Budge Budge Municipality, and the Budge Budge I and Budge Budge II CD blocks.

== Transport ==
Budge Budge is on the Budge Budge Trunk Road.

Budge Budge railway station is on the Sealdah–Budge Budge line of the Kolkata Suburban Railway.

=== Commuters ===
With the electrification of the railways, suburban traffic has grown tremendously since the 1960s. As of 2005–2006, more than 1.7 million (17 lakhs) commuters use the Kolkata Suburban Railway system daily. After the partition of India, refugees from East Pakistan/ Bangladesh had a strong impact on the development of urban areas in the periphery of Kolkata. The new immigrants depended on Kolkata for their livelihood, thus increasing the number of commuters. Eastern Railway runs 1,272 EMU trains daily.

== Notable people ==
- Abinas Ruidas, footballer

== Education ==
- Budge Budge College, established in 1971, is affiliated with the University of Calcutta. It offers honours courses in Bengali, English, Sanskrit, history, political science, philosophy, economics, geography, education, mathematics and accounting & finance, and general degree courses in arts, science, and accounting & finance.
- Budge Budge Institute of Technology, established in 2009, offers diploma, undergraduate and postgraduate degree courses in Engineering and Technology and other allied fields.

== Healthcare ==
Budge Budge ESI Hospital, with 300 beds, is the major government medical facility in the Budge Budge.

== See also ==
- Maheshtala
- Batanagar
- Diamond Harbour
- Barasat
- Barrackpore
- Basirhat
- Kolkata
- Howrah
