= Budge Budge Institute of Technology =

Education organization in Barddhamān, India

- Motto: Empowering Knowledge
- Type: Private, Self-financed
- Established: 2009; 17 years ago
- Affiliations: MAKAUT, WBSCTE
- Director: Probhas Bose
- Location: KP Mondal Rd, Nishchintapur, Budge Budge, West Bengal, 700 137, India; 22°27′30″N 88°10′02″E
- Approvals: AICTE, NAAC, NBA, UGC
- Website: www.bbit.edu.in
- Location within West Bengal Location within India

The Budge Budge Institute of Technology or BBIT is a self-financing college in West Bengal, India offering diploma, undergraduate and postgraduate courses in Engineering and Technology and other allied fields. It was established by a trust named Jagannath Gupta Family Trust. The campus is located at Nischintapur, Budge Budge.

The college is affiliated to West Bengal State Council of Technical Education (diploma courses), Maulana Abul Kalam Azad University of Technology (undergraduate and postgraduate courses) and all the relevant programmes are approved by the All India Council for Technical Education. Techwala a digital marketing consultant in Kolkata, maintains BBIT's social media and other technical area related to website.

== Academics ==
The institute offers five diploma courses:

- DIPLOMA in Electronics and Tele Communication Engineering (ETCE)- 3 years
- DIPLOMA in Electrical Engineering (EE) – 3 years
- DIPLOMA in Mechanical Engineering (ME) – 3 years
- DIPLOMA in Computer Science and Technology (CST)- 3 years
- DIPLOMA in Civil Engineering (CE) – 3 years

It also offers six undergraduate courses:

- B.Tech. in Computer Science and Engineering (CSE)- 4 years [Approved intake – 180]
- B.Tech. in Information Technology (IT) – 4 years [Approved Intake – 60]
- B.Tech. in Electronics and Communication Engineering (ECE) - 4 years [Approved intake – 60]
- B.Tech. in Electrical Engineering (EE) - 4 years [Approved intake – 60]
- B.Tech. in Mechanical Engineering (ME) - 4 years [Approved intake – 60]
- B.Tech. in Civil Engineering (CE)- 4 years [Approved intake – 60]

Three post-graduate courses are offered:

- Master in Business Administration - 2 years [Approved intake – 60]
- M.Tech in Electrical Engineering(Power Systems) - 2 years

[Approved intake – 30]

- M.Tech in Computer Science and Engineering(General) - 2 years [Approved intake – 30]

== See also ==
- List of institutions of higher education in West Bengal
- Education in India
- Education in West Bengal
