= Budge Budge Assembly constituency =

Legislative Assembly constituency in West Bengal, India

Budge Budge
- Constituency No. 156 for the West Bengal Legislative Assembly
- Interactive Map Outlining Budge Budge Assembly Constituency

Constituency details
- Country: India
- Region: East India
- State: West Bengal
- District: South 24 Parganas
- Lok Sabha constituency: Diamond Harbour
- Established: 1951
- Total electors: 255,986
- Reservation: None

Member of Legislative Assembly
- 18th West Bengal Legislative Assembly
- Incumbent Ashok Kumar Deb
- Party: DTC
- Elected year: 2026

Budge Budge Assembly constituency is a Legislative Assembly constituency of South 24 Parganas district in the Indian State of West Bengal.

== Overview ==
As per order of the Delimitation Commission in respect of the Delimitation of constituencies in the West Bengal, Budge Budge Assembly constituency is composed of the following:

- Budge Budge municipality
- Pujali municipality
- Budge Budge I community development block
- Dongaria Raipur, Kasipur Alampur, North Bawali and South Bawali gram panchayats of Budge Budge II community development block

Budge Budge Assembly constituency is a part of No. 21 Diamond Harbour Lok Sabha constituency.

== Members of the Legislative Assembly ==
Year	Name	Party
1952	Bankim Mukherjee	Communist Party of India
1957	Bankim Mukherjee	Communist Party of India
1962	Harolal Halder	Indian National Congress
1967	Kshitij Bhusan Roy Barman	Communist Party of India (Marxist)
1969	Kshitij Bhusan Roy Barman	Communist Party of India (Marxist)
1971	Kshitij Bhusan Roy Barman	Communist Party of India (Marxist)
1972	Kshitij Bhusan Roy Barman	Communist Party of India (Marxist)
1977	Kshitij Bhusan Roy Barman	Communist Party of India (Marxist)
1982	Kshitij Bhusan Roy Barman	Communist Party of India (Marxist)
1987	Kshitij Bhusan Roy Barman	Communist Party of India (Marxist)
1991	Dipak Mukherjee	Communist Party of India (Marxist)
1996	Ashok Kumar Deb	Indian National Congress
2001	Ashok Kumar Deb	Trinamool Congress
2006	Ashok Kumar Deb	Trinamool Congress
2011	Ashok Kumar Deb	Trinamool Congress
2016	Ashok Kumar Deb	Trinamool Congress
2021	Ashok Kumar Deb	Trinamool Congress
2026	Ashok Kumar Deb	Trinamool Congress

== Election results ==
Vote share of Winning candidates
2026	58.27%
2021	56.41%
2016	44.13%
2011	60.04%
2006	57.10%
2001	57.03%
1996	52.16%
1991	47.15%
1987	48.87%
1982	61.41%
1977	65.26%
1972	61.55%
1971	60.64%
1969	61.10%
1967	53.74%
1962	48.69%
1957	51.51%
1952	49.92%

=== 2026 ===
2026 West Bengal Legislative Assembly election: Budge Budge
Party	Candidate	Votes	%	±%
AITC	Ashok Kumar Deb	127,091	58.27	
BJP	Dr. Tarun Kumar Adak	80,241	36.79	
INC	Mujibar Rahman Kayal	5,323	2.44	
CPI(ML)L	Kajal Dutta	2,037	0.93	
NOTA	None of the Above	1,993	0.91	
IND	Mainur Khan	648	0.30	
SUCI(C)	Basudeb Kabri	452	0.21	
IND	Tanmoy Sardar	308	0.14	
Majority		46,850	21.48	
Turnout		218,093	94.80	
AITC hold		Swing		

=== 2021 ===
2021 West Bengal Legislative Assembly election: Budge Budge
Party	Candidate	Votes	%	±%
AITC	Ashok Kumar Deb	122,357	56.41	
BJP	Dr. Tarun Kumar Adak	77,643	35.80	
INC	Sk. Mujibar Rahaman	10,809	4.98	
NOTA	None of the Above	2,735	1.26	
IND	Mukul Chandra Jana	1,143	0.53	
BSP	Bharat Lal Das	932	0.43	
SUCI(C)	Uttam Pal	515	0.24	
IND	Biswajit Das	387	0.18	
IND	Kashyap Upadhyay	371	0.17	
Majority		44,714	20.61	
Turnout		216,892	84.68	
AITC hold		Swing		

=== 2016 ===
2016 West Bengal Legislative Assembly election: Budge Budge
Party	Candidate	Votes	%	±%
AITC	Ashok Kumar Deb	84,058	44.13	
INC	Sk. Mujibar Rahaman	76,899	40.37	
BJP	Uma Shankar Ghosh Dastidar	20,778	10.91	
NOTA	None of the Above	2,859	1.50	
WPOI	Ali Basir Sk.	1,907	1.00	
CPI(ML)L	Kajal Dutta	1,250	0.66	
BSP	Rabindranath Ranjan	1,231	0.65	
SUCI(C)	Tamradhwaj Adak	797	0.42	
IND	Rup Kumar Adak	715	0.38	
Majority		7,159	3.76	
Turnout		190,494	83.23	
AITC hold		Swing		

=== 2011 ===
2011 West Bengal Legislative Assembly election: Budge Budge
Party	Candidate	Votes	%	±%
AITC	Ashok Kumar Deb	99,915	60.04	
CPI(M)	Hrishikesh Podder	53,426	32.11	
BJP	Ariful Islam	6,256	3.76	
IND	Shyama Prasad Santra	2,658	1.60	
IUC	Sk. Basir Ali	1,707	1.03	
BSP	Mukunda Patla	1,302	0.78	
IND	Maloy Santra	1,143	0.69	
Majority		46,489	27.93	
Turnout		166,407	83.30	
AITC hold		Swing		

=== 2006 ===
2006 West Bengal Legislative Assembly election: Budge Budge
Party	Candidate	Votes	%	±%
AITC	Ashok Kumar Deb	72,889	57.10	
CPI(M)	Ratan Bagchi	47,780	37.43	
INC	Nimai Khanra	3,961	3.10	
IND	Maloy Santra	1,759	1.38	
IND	Aloke Deb	1,272	1.00	
Majority		25,109	19.67	
Turnout		127,661		
AITC hold		Swing		

=== 2001 ===
2001 West Bengal Legislative Assembly election: Budge Budge
Party	Candidate	Votes	%	±%
AITC	Ashok Kumar Deb	70,467	57.03	
CPI(M)	Kali Bhandari	47,694	38.60	
BJP	Mihir Mondal	3,576	2.89	
IND	Bechu Mondal	1,824	1.48	
Majority		22,773	18.43	
Turnout		123,564	74.45	
Swing to AITC from INC		Swing		

=== 1996 ===
1996 West Bengal Legislative Assembly election: Budge Budge
Party	Candidate	Votes	%	±%
INC	Ashok Kumar Deb	66,553	52.16	
CPI(M)	Dipak Mukherjee	55,192	43.26	
BJP	Ashok Bhattacherjee	4,699	3.68	
IUML	Ismail Mallick	782	0.61	
IND	Subir Bhattacherya	358	0.28	
Majority		11,361	8.90	
Turnout		130,150	83.42	
Swing to INC from CPI(M)		Swing		

=== 1991 ===
1991 West Bengal Legislative Assembly election: Budge Budge
Party	Candidate	Votes	%	±%
CPI(M)	Dipak Mukherjee	49,487	47.15	
INC	Ashok Kumar Deb	44,358	42.27	
BJP	Astu Basu Santra	10,034	9.56	
IND	Abdul Khalaque Molla	422	0.40	
IND	Arup Haldar	337	0.32	
IND	Subir Bhattacharjee	225	0.21	
IND	Amar Majumdar	87	0.08	
Majority		5,129	4.88	
Turnout		107,278	76.11	
CPI(M) hold		Swing		

=== 1987 ===
1987 West Bengal Legislative Assembly election: Budge Budge
Party	Candidate	Votes	%	±%
CPI(M)	Kshiti Bhusan Roy Barman	43,350	48.87	
INC	Lal Bahadur Singh	41,026	46.25	
IUML	Kausir Ali Mallick	3,516	3.96	
IND	Gagadhar Singha	607	0.68	
IND	Partha Pratim Chatterjee	197	0.22	
Majority		2,324	2.62	
Turnout		90,283	74.26	
CPI(M) hold		Swing		

=== 1982 ===
1982 West Bengal Legislative Assembly election: Budge Budge
Party	Candidate	Votes	%	±%
CPI(M)	Kshitibhusan Roy Barman	40,276	61.41	
INC	Nimai Chand Khanra	24,144	36.82	
BJP	Anil Haldar	814	1.24	
IND	Md. Nour Buksh Molla	347	0.53	
Majority		16,132	24.59	
Turnout		67,839	66.46	
CPI(M) hold		Swing		

=== 1977 ===
1977 West Bengal Legislative Assembly election: Budge Budge
Party	Candidate	Votes	%	±%
CPI(M)	Khitibhusan Burmon	32,297	65.26	
INC	Bipulananda Guha Roy	5,719	11.56	
JP	Dinesh Roy	4,350	8.79	
IND	Mafijaddin Mallick	3,818	7.71	
CPI	Sad Imani Beg	2,967	6.00	
IND	Nimai Chand Khanra	339	0.68	
Majority		26,578	53.70	
Turnout		50,203	56.03	
CPI(M) hold		Swing		

=== 1972 ===
1972 West Bengal Legislative Assembly election: Budge Budge
Party	Candidate	Votes	%	±%
CPI(M)	Khitibhusan Roy Barman	34,873	61.55	
CPI	Bhowani Roy Choudhuroy	21,783	38.45	
Majority		13,090	23.10	
Turnout		57,937	60.50	
CPI(M) hold		Swing		

=== 1971 ===
1971 West Bengal Legislative Assembly election: Budge Budge
Party	Candidate	Votes	%	±%
CPI(M)	Khitibhusan Roy Barman	32,399	60.64	
CPI	Sad Imani Bag	15,602	29.20	
IND	Rabi Chowdhury	2,645	4.95	
BAC	Mahabir Prasad Shau	1,487	2.78	
INC(O)	Ajit Kumar Chakraborty	1,297	2.43	
Majority		16,797	31.44	
Turnout		55,985	60.09	
CPI(M) hold		Swing		

=== 1969 ===
1969 West Bengal Legislative Assembly election: Budge Budge
Party	Candidate	Votes	%	±%
CPI(M)	Khiti Bhusan Roy Barman	37,137	61.10	
INC	Prankrishna Mukherjee	23,643	38.90	
Majority		13,494	22.20	
Turnout		61,954	68.43	
CPI(M) hold		Swing		

=== 1967 ===
1967 West Bengal Legislative Assembly election: Budge Budge
Party	Candidate	Votes	%	±%
CPI(M)	K. B. R. Barman	31,024	53.74	
INC	H. L. Haldar	20,609	35.70	
AIFB	B. B. Ghose	3,942	6.83	
IND	M. K. Polley	2,156	3.73	
Majority		10,415	18.04	
Turnout		59,843	68.62	
Swing to CPI(M) from INC		Swing		

=== 1962 ===
1962 West Bengal Legislative Assembly election: Budge Budge
Party	Candidate	Votes	%	±%
INC	Haralal Haldar	21,573	48.69	
CPI	Kshiti Bhusan Roy Barman	18,244	41.17	
PSP	Surendra Nath Mondal	2,909	6.57	
IND	Nihar Banerjee	627	1.42	
WPI	Ram Das	576	1.30	
IND	Phani Ghose	381	0.86	
Majority		3,329	7.52	
Turnout		45,588	58.49	
Swing to INC from CPI		Swing		

=== 1957 ===
1957 West Bengal Legislative Assembly election: Budge Budge
Party	Candidate	Votes	%	±%
CPI	Bankim Mukherji	18,443	51.51	
INC	Abu Mohammed Akhtaruzaman	12,708	35.49	
IND	Manmatha Roy	4,653	13.00	
Majority		5,735	16.02	
Turnout		35,804	54.91	
CPI hold		Swing		

=== 1952 ===
1952 West Bengal Legislative Assembly election: Budge Budge
Party	Candidate	Votes	%	±%
CPI	Bankim Mukherjee	13,171	49.92	
INC	Kalipada Mookherjee	6,335	24.01	
IND	Shaikh Mahammad Ali	2,414	9.15	
IND	Ram Chandra Awtashi	1,472	5.58	
RCPI	Sudarshan Chatterjee	1,190	4.51	
IND	Surendra Nath Mandal	1,049	3.98	
IND	Devenda Nath Sukul	358	1.36	
IND	Bibhuti Bhushan Ghosh	204	0.77	
IND	Provash Chandru Dhar	191	0.72	
Majority		6,836	25.91	
Turnout		26,384	48.40	
CPI win (new seat)				
