= Komagata Maru Budge Budge railway station =

Railway Station in West Bengal, India

Komagata Maru Budge Budge
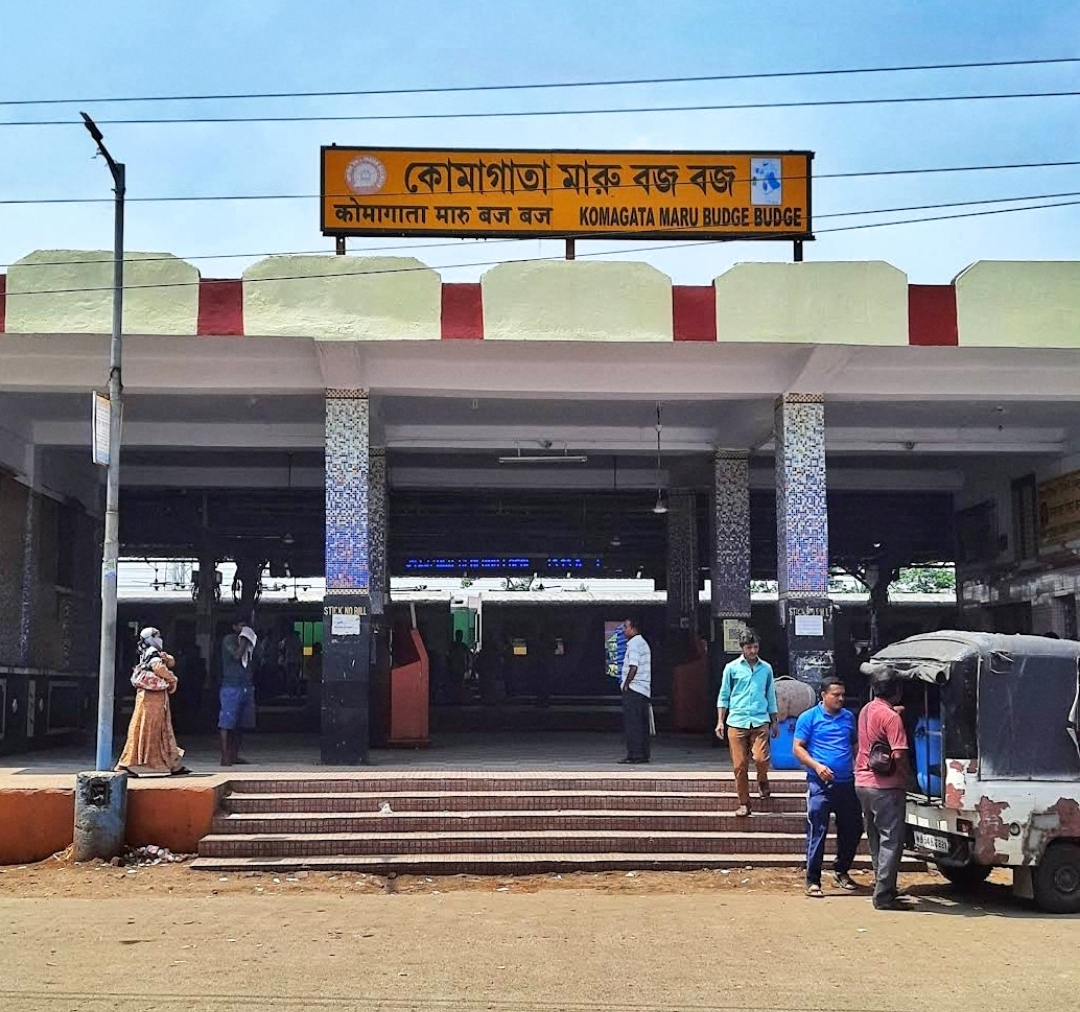
- Komagata Maru Budge Budge Railway Station

General information
- Location: Budge Budge, South 24 Parganas, West Bengal 700137; India
- Coordinates: 22.4928895°N 88.1948585°E
- Elevation: 9 metres (30 ft)
- System: Kolkata Suburban Railway Station
- Owner: Indian Railways
- Operator: Eastern Railway
- Line: Budge Budge Branch line
- Platforms: 1
- Tracks: 2

Construction
- Structure type: Standard (on-ground station)
- Parking: Available
- Cycle facilities: Available
- Accessible: Not Available

Other information
- Status: Functioning
- Station code: KBGB
- Zone(s): Eastern Railway
- Division(s): Sealdah

History
- Opened: 1890; 136 years ago
- Electrified: 1965–66
- Former names: Eastern Bengal Railway
Services
Preceding station	Kolkata Suburban Railway	Following station
Terminus	Sealdah South Budge Budge Branch line	Nangi towards Sealdah
Route map
Location

Komagata Maru Budge Budge (previously known as Budge Budge) is a terminal station of Kolkata Suburban Railway on the Budge Budge Branch line. It is under the jurisdiction of the Sealdah railway division in the Eastern Railway zone of the Indian Railways. It serves the local area of Budge Budge in South 24 Parganas district in the Indian state of West Bengal.

== History ==
In 1890, the Eastern Bengal Railway constructed a 1,676 mm (5 ft 6 in)-wide broad-gauge railway from Ballygunge Junction to Budge Budge.

In 2013, the station was renamed from Budge Budge to commemorate those killed in the Komagata Maru incident.

== Electrification ==
Electrification from Ballygunge Junction to Budge Budge was completed with 25 kV AC overhead system in 1965–66.

== Station complex ==
The platform is very much well sheltered. The station possesses many facilities including water and sanitation. There is a proper approach road to this station.

== Connections ==
On a non-holiday a total of 22 trains run from Budge Budge to Sealdah and 3 trains traverse the Kolkata Circular Railway route to reach Naihati Junction.
