= Kanyanagar =

- Census Town
- Location in West Bengal Location in India
- Coordinates: 22.3810°N 88.2486°E
- Country: India
- State: West Bengal
- District: South 24 Parganas
- CD block: Bishnupur I

Area
  - Total: 1.80 km^{2} (0.69 sq mi)
- Elevation: 9 m (30 ft)

Population (2011)
  - Total: 10,823
  - Density: 6,010/km^{2} (15,600/sq mi)

Languages
  - Official: Bengali
  - Additional official: English
- Time zone: UTC+5:30 (IST)
- PIN: 743503
- Telephone code: +91 33
- Vehicle registration: WB-19 to WB-22, WB-95 to WB-99
- Lok Sabha constituency: Diamond Harbour
- Vidhan Sabha constituency: Bishnupur (SC)
- Website: www.s24pgs.gov.in

Kanyanagar is a census town within the jurisdiction of the Bishnupur police station in the Bishnupur I CD block in the Alipore Sadar subdivision of the South 24 Parganas district in the Indian state of West Bengal.

== Geography ==
Cities and towns in the eastern part of Alipore Sadar subdivision (including Bishnupur I & II CD blocks) in South 24 Parganas district
M: municipal city/ town, CT: census town, R: rural/ urban centre, N: neighbourhood
Owing to space constraints in the small map, the actual locations in a larger map may vary slightly

=== Area overview ===
Alipore Sadar subdivision is a most urbanized part of the South 24 Parganas district. 59.85% of the population lives in the urban areas and 40.15% lives in the rural areas. In the southern portion of the subdivision (shown in the map alongside) there are 15 census towns. The entire district is situated in the Ganges Delta and the subdivision, on the east bank of the Hooghly River, is an alluvial stretch, with industrial development.

Note: The map alongside presents some of the notable locations in the subdivision. All places marked in the map are linked in the larger full screen map.

=== Location ===
Kanyanagar is located at 22°22′52″N 88°14′55″E. It has an average elevation of 9 metres (30 ft).

Bishnupur, Kanyanagar, Amtala, Ramkrishnapur, Kriparampur and Chak Enayetnagar (a little away) form a cluster of census towns, as per the map of the Bishnupur I CD block on page 207 and map of the Bishnupur II CD block on page 233 of the District Census Handbook 2011 for the South 24 Parganas.

== Demographics ==
According to the 2011 census of India, Kanyanagar had a total population of 10,823, of which 5,499 (51%) were males and 5,324 (49%) were females. There were 848 persons in the age range of 0 to 6 years. The total number of literate persons was 8,663 (86.85% of the population over 6 years).

According to the 2001 Census of India, Kanyanagar had a population of 10,193. Males constitute 51% of the population and females 49%. It has an average literacy rate of 78%, higher than the national average of 59.5%: male literacy is 85%, and female literacy is 71%. 9% of the population is under 6 years of age.

== Infrastructure ==
According to the District Census Handbook 2011, Kanyanagar covered an area of 1.8 km^{2}. Among the civic amenities, the protected water supply involved over-head tank and service reservoir. It had 1,600 domestic electric connections. Among the medical facilities it had 1 hospital, 2 dispensary/ health centres. Among the educational facilities it had were 4 primary schools, 1 middle school, 1 secondary school, nearest senior secondary school at Bishnupur, 1 km away. Among the social, recreational and cultural facilities it had 1 public library. Three important commodities it produced were muri (puffed rice), textiles, soft toys.

== Transport ==
A short stretch of local roads link Kanyanagar to the National Highway 12.

== Education ==
Udayrampur Pallisree Sikhsayatan is a coeducational school affiliated with the West Bengal Board of Secondary Education.

Vidyanagar College was established at Vidyanagar in 1963.

== Healthcare ==
Chandi Doulatabad Block Primary Health Centre, with 10 beds, at Doulatabad (PO Nepalganj), is the major government medical facility in the Bishnupur I CD block.
