= Sarmaster Chak =

- Village
- Location in West Bengal Location in India
- Coordinates: 22.4380°N 88.2955°E
- Country: India
- State: West Bengal
- District: South 24 Parganas
- CD Block: Bishnupur I

Area
  - Total: 0.43 km^{2} (0.17 sq mi)
- Elevation: 9 m (30 ft)

Population (2011)
  - Total: 894
  - Density: 2,100/km^{2} (5,400/sq mi)

Languages
  - Official: Bengali
  - Additional official: English
- Time zone: UTC+5:30 (IST)
- PIN: 743398
- Telephone code: +91 33
- Vehicle registration: WB-19 to WB-22, WB-95 to WB-99
- Lok Sabha constituency: Diamond Harbour
- Vidhan Sabha constituency: Bishnupur (SC)
- Website: www.s24pgs.gov.in

Sarmaster Chak is a village within the jurisdiction of the Bishnupur police station in the Bishnupur I CD block in the Alipore Sadar subdivision of the South 24 Parganas district in the Indian state of West Bengal.

== Geography ==
Sarmaster Chak is located at 22°26′17″N 88°17′44″E. It has an average elevation of 9 metres (30 ft).

== Demographics ==
As per 2011 Census of India, Sarmaster Chak had a total population of 894.

== Transport ==
Sarmaster Chak is on the National Highway 12.

Majerhat railway station is located nearby.

== Healthcare ==
Chandi Doulatabad Block Primary Health Centre, with 10 beds, at Doulatabad (PO Nepalganj), is the major government medical facility in the Bishnupur I CD block.
