= Bora Gagangohalia =

- Census Town
- Location in West Bengal Location in India
- Coordinates: 22.3907°N 88.2608°E
- Country: India
- State: West Bengal
- District: South 24 Parganas
- CD block: Bishnupur II

Area
  - Total: 1.94 km^{2} (0.75 sq mi)
- Elevation: 9 m (30 ft)

Population (2011)
  - Total: 5,274
  - Density: 2,720/km^{2} (7,040/sq mi)

Languages
  - Official: Bengali
  - Additional official: English
- Time zone: UTC+5:30 (IST)
- PIN: 743503
- Telephone code: +91 33
- Vehicle registration: WB-19 to WB-22, WB-95 to WB-99
- Lok Sabha constituency: Diamond Harbour
- Vidhan Sabha constituency: Satgachhia
- Website: www.s24pgs.gov.in

Bora Gagangohalia is a census town within the jurisdiction of the Bishnupur police station in the Bishnupur II CD block in the Alipore Sadar subdivision of the South 24 Parganas district in the Indian state of West Bengal.

== Geography ==
Cities and towns in the eastern part of Alipore Sadar subdivision (including Bishnupur I & II CD blocks) in South 24 Parganas district
M: municipal city/ town, CT: census town, R: rural/ urban centre, N: neighbourhood
Owing to space constraints in the small map, the actual locations in a larger map may vary slightly

=== Area overview ===
The Alipore Sadar subdivision is the most urbanized part of the South 24 Parganas district. 59.85% of the population lives in the urban areas and 40.15% lives in the rural areas. In the southern portion of the subdivision (shown in the map alongside) there are 15 census towns. The entire district is situated in the Ganges Delta and the subdivision, on the east bank of the Hooghly River, is an alluvial stretch, with industrial development.

Note: The map alongside presents some of the notable locations in the subdivision. All places marked in the map are linked in the larger full screen map.

=== Location ===
Bora Gagangohalia is located at 22°23′27″N 88°15′39″E. It has an average elevation of 9 metres (30 ft).

Nadabhanga, Kanganbaria, Bora Gagangohalia, Barkalikapur, Chanddandaha and Patharberia (a little away) form a cluster of census towns, as per the map of the Bishnupur II CD block on page 233 of the District Census Handbook 2011 for the South 24 Parganas.

== Demographics ==
According to the 2011 Census of India, Bora Gagangohalia had a total population of 5,274, of which 2,692 (51%) were males and 2,582 (49%) were females. There were 486 persons in the age range of 0 to 6 years. The total number of literate persons in Bora Gagangohalia was 4,147 (86.61% of the population over 6 years).

== Infrastructure ==
According to the District Census Handbook 2011, Bora Gagangohalia covered an area of 1.9373 km^{2}. Among the civic amenities, it had 20.8 km roads. the protected water supply involved service reservoir. It had 499 domestic electric connections. Among the medical facilities it had a hospital 4 km away, 3 medicine shops. Among the educational facilities it had were 2 primary schools, 1 middle school, 1 secondary school, the nearest senior secondary school, general degree college were at Vidyanagar 3.2 km away. Among the social, recreational and cultural facilities, public library and reading room were there in Vidyanagar. An important commodity it produced was puffed rice.

== Transport ==
Bora Gagangohalia is on the National Highway 12.

== Education ==
Nandabhanga High School is a Bengali-medium coeducational high school established in 1964. It has facilities for teaching from class VI to class X.

== Healthcare ==
Amtala Rural Hospital, with 50 beds, at Amtala, is the major government medical facility in the Bishnupur II CD block.
