= Uttar Kazirhat =

- Village
- Location in West Bengal Location in India
- Coordinates: 22.4170°N 88.2729°E
- Country: India
- State: West Bengal
- District: South 24 Parganas
- CD Block: Bishnupur I

Area
  - Total: 1.45 km^{2} (0.56 sq mi)
- Elevation: 9 m (30 ft)

Population (2011)
  - Total: 2,577
  - Density: 1,780/km^{2} (4,600/sq mi)

Languages
  - Official: Bengali
  - Additional official: English
- Time zone: UTC+5:30 (IST)
- PIN: 743398
- Telephone code: +91 33
- Vehicle registration: WB-19 to WB-22, WB-95 to WB-99
- Lok Sabha constituency: Diamond Harbour
- Vidhan Sabha constituency: Bishnupur (SC)
- Website: www.s24pgs.gov.in

Uttar Kazirhat is a village within the jurisdiction of the Bishnupur police station in the Bishnupur I CD block in the Alipore Sadar subdivision of the South 24 Parganas district in the Indian state of West Bengal.

== Geography ==
Uttar Kazirhat is located at 22°25′01″N 88°16′22″E. It has an average elevation of 9 metres (30 ft).

== Demographics ==
As per 2011 Census of India, Uttar Kazirhat had a total population of 2,577.

== Transport ==
Uttar Kazirhat is on the National Highway 12.

== Healthcare ==
Chandi Doulatabad Block Primary Health Centre, with 10 beds, at Doulatabad (PO Nepalganj), is the major government medical facility in the Bishnupur I CD block.
