= Daulatpur, Bishnupur =

Daulatpur
- Census Town
- Location in West Bengal Location in India
- Coordinates: 22.4354°N 88.3070°E
- Country: India
- State: West Bengal
- District: South 24 Parganas
- CD block: Bishnupur I

Area
  - Total: 1.76 km^{2} (0.68 sq mi)
- Elevation: 9 m (30 ft)

Population (2011)
  - Total: 6,568
  - Density: 3,730/km^{2} (9,670/sq mi)

Languages
  - Official: Bengali
  - Additional official: English
- Time zone: UTC+5:30 (IST)
- PIN: 700104
- Telephone code: +91 33
- Vehicle registration: WB-19 to WB-22, WB-95 to WB-99
- Lok Sabha constituency: Diamond Harbour
- Vidhan Sabha constituency: Bishnupur (SC)
- Website: www.s24pgs.gov.in

Daulatpur is a census town in the Bishnupur I CD block in the Alipore Sadar subdivision of the South 24 Parganas district in the Indian state of West Bengal.

== Geography ==
Cities and towns in the eastern part of Alipore Sadar subdivision (including Bishnupur I & II CD blocks) in South 24 Parganas district
M: municipal city/ town, CT: census town, R: rural/ urban centre, N: neighbourhood
Owing to space constraints in the small map, the actual locations in a larger map may vary slightly

=== Area overview ===
The Alipore Sadar subdivision is the most urbanized part of the South 24 Parganas district. 59.85% of the population lives in the urban areas and 40.15% lives in the rural areas. In the southern portion of the subdivision (shown in the map alongside) there are 15 census towns. The entire district is situated in the Ganges Delta and the subdivision, on the east bank of the Hooghly River, is an alluvial stretch, with industrial development.

Note: The map alongside presents some of the notable locations in the subdivision. All places marked in the map are linked in the larger full screen map.

=== Location ===
Daulatpur is located at 22°26′07″N 88°18′25″E. It has an average elevation of 9 metres (30 ft).

== Demographics ==
According to the 2011 census of India, Daulatpur had a total population of 6,568, of which 3,239 (49%) were males and 3,329 (51%) were females. There were 819 persons in the age range of 0 to 6 years. The total number of literate persons was 4,278 (74.41% of the population over 6 years).

== Infrastructure ==
According to the District Census Handbook 2011, Daulatpur covered an area of 1.7584 km^{2}. Majerhat railway station is 12 km away. Among the civic amenities, the protected water supply involved over-head tank and service reservoir. It had 1,342 domestic electric connections. Among the medical facilities it had 1 dispensary/ health centre, 1 family welfare centre, 2 charitable hospitals/ nursing homes and 4 medicine shops. Among the educational facilities it had were 3 primary schools, the nearest secondary and senior secondary schools at Amgachia 4 km away, a general degree college at Thakurpukur 6 km away, 1 engineering college, 1 management institute/ college. Important commodities it produced were zari saris and embroidery work. It had the branches of 1 nationalised bank and 1 non-agricultural credit society.

== Transport ==
Daulatpur is on the National Highway 12.

Majerhat railway station is located nearby.

== Education ==
Pailan College of Management and Technology at Amgachia Road, Pailan, Joka, offers courses in management, computer applications and engineering.

Pailan World School, Bengal Pailan Park, Joka, is affiliated with ICSE/ ISC boards. It has hostel facilities.

Abhoy Charan Vidyapith at Amgachi is a Bengali-medium coeducational school established in 1965. It has facilities for teaching from class VI to class XII.

Daulatpur High School is a coeducational institution.

== Healthcare ==
Chandi Doulatabad Block Primary Health Centre, with 10 beds, at Doulatabad (PO Nepalganj), is the major government medical facility in the Bishnupur I CD block.
