= Chak Enayetnagar =

- Census Town
- Location in West Bengal Location in India
- Coordinates: 22.3718°N 88.2942°E
- Country: India
- State: West Bengal
- District: South 24 Parganas
- CD block: Bishnupur II

Area
  - Total: 0.46 km^{2} (0.18 sq mi)
- Elevation: 9 m (30 ft)

Population (2011)
  - Total: 6,754
  - Density: 15,000/km^{2} (38,000/sq mi)

Languages
  - Official: Bengali
  - Additional official: English
- Time zone: UTC+5:30 (IST)
- PIN: 743503
- Telephone code: +91 33
- Vehicle registration: WB-19 to WB-22, WB-95 to WB-99
- Lok Sabha constituency: Diamond Harbour
- Vidhan Sabha constituency: Satgachhia
- Website: www.s24pgs.gov.in

Chak Enayetnagar is a census town and a gram panchayat within the jurisdiction of the Bishnupur police station in the Bishnupur II CD block in the Alipore Sadar subdivision of the South 24 Parganas district in the Indian state of West Bengal.

== Geography ==
Cities and towns in the eastern part of Alipore Sadar subdivision (including Bishnupur I & II CD blocks) in South 24 Parganas district
M: municipal city/ town, CT: census town, R: rural/ urban centre, N: neighbourhood
Owing to space constraints in the small map, the actual locations in a larger map may vary slightly

=== Area overview ===
The Alipore Sadar subdivision is the most urbanized part of the South 24 Parganas district. 59.85% of the population lives in the urban areas and 40.15% lives in the rural areas. In the southern portion of the subdivision (shown in the map alongside) there are 15 census towns. The entire district is situated in the Ganges Delta and the subdivision, on the east bank of the Hooghly River, is an alluvial stretch, with industrial development.

Note: The map alongside presents some of the notable locations in the subdivision. All places marked in the map are linked in the larger full screen map.

=== Location ===
Chak Enayetnagar is located at 22°22′18″N 88°17′39″E. It has an average elevation of 9 metres (30 ft).

Bishnupur, Kanyanagar, Amtala, Ramkrishnapur, Kriparampur and Chak Enayetnagar (a little away) form a cluster of census towns, as per the map of the Bishnupur I CD block on page 207 and the map of the Bishnupur II CD block on page 233 of the District Census Handbook 2011 for the South 24 Parganas.

== Demographics ==
According to the 2011 Census of India, Chak Enayetnagar had a total population of 6,754, of which 3,491 (52%) were males and 3,263 (48%) were females. There were 929 persons in the age range of 0 to 6 years. The total number of literate persons was 4,524 (77.67% of the population over 6 years).

According to the 2001 Census of India, Chak Enayetnagar had a population of 5,661. Males constitute 50% of the population and females 50%. It has an average literacy rate of 54%, lower than the national average of 59.5%; with male literacy of 60% and female literacy of 47%. 17% of the population is under 6 years of age.

== Infrastructure ==
According to the District Census Handbook 2011, Chak Enayetnagar covered an area of 0.46 km^{2}. Among the civic amenities, it had 2 km roads with open drains, the protected water supply involved service reservoir. It had 461 domestic electric connections. Among the medical facilities it had 1 dispensary/ health centre. Among the educational facilities it had were 1 primary school and 1 secondary school, 1 senior secondary school, the nearest general degree college at Vidyanagar 7 km away. It had 1 non-formal education centre (Sarba Siksha Abhiyan). It had the branch of 6 nationalised banks, 2 private commercial banks and 1 co-operative bank.

== Transport ==
Baruipur-Amtala Road links Chak Enayetnagar to the National Highway 12.

== Education ==
Enayetnagar MI High Madrasah is a co-educational institution. It is a higher secondary madrasha affiliated to the West Bengal Board of Madrasah Education.

Pirtala High School is a Bengali-medium coeducational institution, established in 1947. It has facilities for teaching from class V to class XII.

== Healthcare ==
Amtala Rural Hospital, with 50 beds, at Amtala, is the major government medical facility in the Bishnupur II CD block.
