= Kriparampur =

- Census Town
- Location in West Bengal Location in India
- Coordinates: 22.3575°N 88.2678°E
- Country: India
- State: West Bengal
- District: South 24 Parganas
- CD block: Bishnupur II

Area
  - Total: 1.80 km^{2} (0.69 sq mi)
- Elevation: 9 m (30 ft)

Population (2011)
  - Total: 3,778
  - Density: 2,100/km^{2} (5,440/sq mi)

Languages
  - Official: Bengali
  - Additional official: English
- Time zone: UTC+5:30 (IST)
- PIN: 743398
- Telephone code: +91 33
- Vehicle registration: WB-19 to WB-22, WB-95 to WB-99
- Lok Sabha constituency: Diamond Harbour
- Vidhan Sabha constituency: Satgachhia
- Website: www.s24pgs.gov.in

Kriparampur is a census town within the jurisdiction of the Bishnupur police station in the Bishnupur II CD block in the Alipore Sadar subdivision of the South 24 Parganas district in the Indian state of West Bengal.

== Geography ==
Cities and towns in the eastern part of Alipore Sadar subdivision (including Bishnupur I & II CD blocks) in South 24 Parganas district
M: municipal city/ town, CT: census town, R: rural/ urban centre, N: neighbourhood
Owing to space constraints in the small map, the actual locations in a larger map may vary slightly

=== Area overview ===
The Alipore Sadar subdivision is the most urbanized part of the South 24 Parganas district. 59.85% of the population lives in the urban areas and 40.15% lives in the rural areas. In the southern portion of the subdivision (shown in the map alongside) there are 15 census towns. The entire district is situated in the Ganges Delta and the subdivision, on the east bank of the Hooghly River, is an alluvial stretch, with industrial development.

Note: The map alongside presents some of the notable locations in the subdivision. All places marked in the map are linked in the larger full screen map.

=== Location ===
Kriparampur is located at 22°21′27″N 88°16′04″E. It has an average elevation of 9 metres (30 ft).

Bishnupur, Kanyanagar, Amtala, Ramkrishnapur, Kriparampur and Chak Enayetnagar (a little away) form a cluster of census towns, as per the map of the Bishnupur I CD block on page 207 and the map of the Bishnupur II CD block on page 233 of the District Census Handbook 2011 for the South 24 Parganas.

== Demographics ==
According to the 2011 Census of India, Kriparampur had a total population of 3,778, of which 1,935 (51%) were males and 1,843 (49%) were females. There were 347 persons in the age range of 0 to 6 years. The total number of literate persons in Kriparampur was 2,983 (86.94% of the population over 6 years).

== Infrastructure ==
According to the District Census Handbook 2011, Kriparampur covered an area of 1.7973 km^{2}. Among the civic amenities, the protected water supply involved over-head tank and service reservoir. It had 600 domestic electric connections and 15 road light points. Among the medical facilities it had 4 dispensaries/ health centres, a nursing home 2 km away and 2 medicine shops. Among the educational facilities it had were 1 primary school and 1 secondary school, the nearest middle and senior secondary schools at Pallishree 2 km away, the nearest general degree college at Vidyanagar 7 km away. It had 1 non-formal education centre (Sarba Siksha Abhiyan). Three important commodities it produced were plywood, brush and biri. It had the branch of 1 agricultural credit society.

== Economy ==
=== Tourism ===
Ibiza, the Fern resort and spa, is located on the Diamond Harbour Road.

== Transport ==
Kriparampur is on the National Highway 12.

== Education ==
Roraty Rabindra Bidyapith, Gangrampur, is Bengali-medium coeducational institution established in 1962. It has facilities for teaching from class V to class X.

== Healthcare ==
Amtala Rural Hospital, with 50 beds, at Amtala, is the major government medical facility in the Bishnupur II CD block.
