= Bishnupur II =

Community Development Block in West Bengal, India

- Community Development Block
- Location of Bishnupur II community development block in South 24 Parganas district
- Coordinates: 22.3812°N 88.2680°E
- Country: India
- State: West Bengal
- Division: Presidency
- District: South 24 Parganas
- Subdivision: Alipore Sadar
- Headquarters: Bakrahat

Government
  - Gram Panchayats: Bakhrahat, Chak Enayetnagar, Chandi, Gobindapur Kalicharanpur, Kanganberia, Khagramuri, Maukhali, Nahajari, Panchanan, Patharberia Jaychandipur, Ramkrishnapur Borhanpur
  - Lok Sabha constituencies: Diamond Harbour
  - Vidhan Sabha constituencies: Satgachhia

Area
  - Total: 81.71 km^{2} (31.55 sq mi)

Population (2011)
  - Total: 214,531
  - Density: 2,626/km^{2} (6,800/sq mi)
  - Urban: 75,552

Demographics
  - Literacy: 81.37 per cent
  - Sex ratio: 957 ♂/♀

Languages
  - Official: Bengali
  - Additional official: English
- Time zone: UTC+05:30 (IST)
- Website: s24pgs.gov.in

Bishnupur II is a community development block that forms an administrative division in Alipore Sadar subdivision of South 24 Parganas district in the Indian state of West Bengal.

== Geography ==

The Bishnupur II CD block is located at 22°22′52″N 88°16′05″E. It has an average elevation of 9 metres (30 ft).

The Bishnupur II CD block is bounded by the Thakurpukur Maheshtala CD block in the north, the Bishnupur I CD block in the east, the Falta and Magrahat I CD blocks in the south and the Budge Budge I and Budge Budge II CD blocks in the west.

The South 24 Parganas district is divided into two distinct physiographic zones: the marine-riverine delta in the north and the marine delta zone in the south. As the sea receded southwards, in the sub-recent geological period, a large low-lying plain became exposed. Both tidal inflows and the rivers have deposited sediments in this plain. The periodical collapse of both the natural levees and man-made embankments speed up the process of filling the depressions containing Brackish Water wetlands. The marine delta in the south is formed of interlacing tidal channels. As non-saline water for irrigation is scarce, agriculture is monsoon-dominated. Some parts of the wetlands are still preserved for raising fish.

The Bishnupur II CD block has an area of 81.71 km^{2}. It has 1 panchayat samity, 11 gram panchayats, 167 gram sansads (village councils), 62 mouzas and 52 inhabited villages, as per the District Statistical Handbook for South Twenty-four Parganas. Bishnupur police station serves this CD Block. Headquarters of this CD block is at Bakrahat.

Gram panchayats of the Bishnupur II CD block/panchayat samiti are: Bakhrahat, Chak Enayetnagar, Chandi, Gobindapur Kalicharanpur, Kanganberia, Khagramuri, Maukhali, Nahajari, Panchanan, Patharberia Jaychandipur and Ramkrishnapur Borhanpur.

== Demographics ==
=== Population ===
According to the 2011 Census of India, the Bishnupur II CD block had a total population of 214,531, of which 138,979 were rural and 75,552 were urban. There were 109,603 (51%) males and 104,928 (49%) females. There were 23,351 persons in the age range of 0 to 6 years. The Scheduled Castes numbered 33,378 (15.56%) and the Scheduled Tribes numbered 87 (0.04%).

According to the 2001 Census of India, the Bishnupur II CD block had a total population of 190,616, out of which 98,027 were males and 92,589 were females. the Bishnupur II CD block registered a population growth of 14.87% during the 1991-2001 decade. Decadal growth for the South 24 Parganas district was 20.89%. Decadal growth in West Bengal was 17.84%. The Scheduled Castes at 33,282 formed around one-sixth the population. The Scheduled Tribes numbered 1,452.

Census Towns in the Bishnupur II CD block (2011 census figures in brackets): Nahazari (17,422), Nadabhanga (5,927), Kanganbaria (6,657), Bora Gagangohalia (5,274), Chanddandaha (5,656), Barkalikapur (4,650), Patharberia (4,698), Ramkrishnapur (5,971), Amtala (8,765), Kriparampur (3,778) and Chak Enayetnagar (6,754).

Large villages (with 4,000+ population) in the Bishnupur II CD block (2011 census figures in brackets): Khagramuri (5,734), Joychandipur (4,541), Gobindapur (5,588), Sultanganja (4,486), Borahanpur (7,218), Gangarampur (4,016), Enayetnagar (4,617), Mirpur (4,676) and Chandi (13,332).

Other villages in the Bishnupur II CD block include (2011 census figures in brackets): Maukhali (3,705).

=== Literacy ===
According to the 2011 census, the total number of literates in the Bishnupur II CD block was 155,554 (81.37% of the population over 6 years) out of which males numbered 84,495 (86.44% of the male population over 6 years) and females numbered 71,059 (76.05% of the female population over 6 years). The gender disparity (the difference between female and male literacy rates) was 10.39%.

According to the 2011 Census of India, literacy in the South 24 Parganas district was 77.51%. Literacy in West Bengal was 77.08% in 2011. Literacy in India in 2011 was 74.04%.

According to the 2001 Census of India, the Bishnupur II CD block had a total literacy of 73.42% for the 6+ age group. While male literacy was 81.77% female literacy was 64.54%. The South 24 Parganas district had a total literacy of 69.45%, male literacy being 79.19% and female literacy being 59.01%.

See also – List of West Bengal districts ranked by literacy rate

Literacy in CD blocks of
South 24 Parganas district
Alipore Sadar subdivision
Bishnupur I – 78.33%
Bishnupur II – 81.37%
Budge Budge I – 80.57%
Budge Budge II – 79.13%
Thakurpukur Maheshtala – 83.54%
Baruipur subdivision
Baruipur – 76.46%
Bhangar I – 72.06%
Bhangar II – 74.49%
Jaynagar I – 73.17%
Jaynagar II – 69.71%
Kultali – 69.37%
Sonarpur – 79.70%
Canning subdivision
Basanti – 68.32%
Canning I – 70.76%
Canning II – 66.51%
Gosaba – 78.98%
Diamond Harbour subdivision
Diamond Harbour I – 75.72%
Diamond Harbour II – 76.91%
Falta – 77.17%
Kulpi – 75.49%
Magrahat I – 73.82%
Magrahat II – 77.41%
Mandirbazar – 75.89%
Mathurapur I – 73.93%
Mathurapur II – 77.77%
Kakdwip subdivision
Kakdwip – 77.93%
Namkhana – 85.72
Patharpratima – 82.11%
Sagar – 84.21%
Source: 2011 Census: CD Block Wise
Primary Census Abstract Data

=== Language ===
Languages of Bishnupur II CD block (2011)
1. Bengali (99.5%)
2. Hindi (0.50%)
3. Urdu (0.02%)
4. Others (0.01%)

At the time of the 2011 census, 99.47% of the population spoke Bengali, 0.50% Hindi and 0.02% Urdu as their first language.

=== Religion ===
Religion in Bishnupur II CD block (2011)
| Hinduism | 61.92% |
| Islam | 37.60% |
| Other or not stated | 0.48% |

In the 2011 Census of India, Hindus numbered 132,844 and formed 61.92% of the population in the Bishnupur II CD block. Muslims numbered 80,651 and formed 37.60% of the population. Others numbered 1,036 and formed 0.48% of the population.

The proportion of Muslims here has increased from 23.4% to 35.6% during the same period. Christians formed 0.8% in 2011.

== Rural poverty ==
As per the Human Development Report for the South 24 Parganas district, published in 2009, in the Bishnupur II CD block the percentage of households below poverty line was 10.62%, a comparatively low level of poverty. As per rural household survey in 2005, the proportion of households in the South 24 Parganas with poverty rates below poverty line was 34.11%, way above the state and national poverty ratios. The poverty rates were very high in the Sundarbans settlements with all thirteen CD blocks registering poverty ratios above 30% and eight CD blocks had more than 40% of the population in the BPL category.

== Economy ==
=== Livelihood ===
Livelihood
in Bishnupur II CD block
1. Cultivators (5.96%)
2. Agricultural labourers (12.8%)
3. Household industries (17.1%)
4. Other Workers (64.2%)

In the Bishnupur II CD block in 2011, among the class of total workers, cultivators numbered 4,787 and formed 5.96%, agricultural labourers numbered 10,927 and formed 12.81%, household industry workers numbered 13,705 and formed 17.05% and other workers numbered 51,576and formed 64.18%. Total workers numbered 80,365 and formed 37.46% of the total population, and non-workers numbered 134,166 and formed 62.54% of the population.

The District Human Development Report points out that in the blocks of region situated in the close proximity of the Kolkata metropolis, overwhelming majority are involved in the non-agricultural sector for their livelihood. On the other hand, in the Sundarbans settlements, overwhelming majority are dependent on agriculture. In the intermediate region, there is again predominance of the non-agricultural sector. Though the region is not very close to Kolkata, many places are well connected and some industrial/ economic development has taken place.

Note: In the census records a person is considered a cultivator, if the person is engaged in cultivation/ supervision of land owned by self/government/institution. When a person who works on another person's land for wages in cash or kind or share, is regarded as an agricultural labourer. Household industry is defined as an industry conducted by one or more members of the family within the household or village, and one that does not qualify for registration as a factory under the Factories Act. Other workers are persons engaged in some economic activity other than cultivators, agricultural labourers and household workers. It includes factory, mining, plantation, transport and office workers, those engaged in business and commerce, teachers, entertainment artistes and so on.

=== Infrastructure ===
There are 52 inhabited villages in the Bishnupur II CD block, as per the District Census Handbook, South Twenty-four Parganas, 2011. 100% villages have power supply. 51 villages (98.08%) have drinking water supply. 13 villages (25.00%) have post offices. 48 villages (92.31%) have telephones (including landlines, public call offices and mobile phones). 27 villages (51.92%) have pucca (paved) approach roads and 19 villages (36.94%) have transport communication (includes bus service, rail facility and navigable waterways). 3 villages (5.77%) has agricultural credit societies and 6 villages (11.54%) have banks.

=== Agriculture ===
The South 24 Parganas had played a significant role in the Tebhaga movement launched by the Communist Party of India in 1946. Subsequently, Operation Barga was aimed at securing tenancy rights for the peasants. In the Bishnupur II CD block 111.03 acres of land was acquired and vested. Out of this 84.81 acres or 76.88% of the vested land was distributed. The total number of patta (document) holders was 424.

According to the District Human Development Report, agriculture is an important source of livelihood in the South Twentyfour Parganas district. The amount of cultivable land per agricultural worker is only 0.41 hectare in the district. Moreover, the irrigation facilities have not been extended to a satisfactory scale. Agriculture mostly remains a mono-cropped activity.

As per the District Census Handbook, the saline soil of the district is unfit for cultivation, but the non-salty lands are very fertile. While rice is the main food crop, jute is the main cash crop.

In 2013–14, there were 21 fertiliser depots, 37 seed stores and 44 fair price shops in the Bishnupur II CD block.

In 2013–14, the Bishnupur II CD block produced 752 tonnes of Aman paddy, the main winter crop from 1,953 hectares, 1,712 tonnes of Boro paddy (spring crop) from 535 hectares.

=== Pisciculture ===
In the Bishnupur II CD block, in 2013–14, net area under effective pisciculture was 1,225 hectares, engaging 9,985 persons in the profession, and with an approximate annual production of 25,940 quintals.

Pisciculture is an important source of employment in the South 24 Parganas district. As of 2001, more than 4.5 lakh people were engaged in Pisciculture. Out of this 2.57 lakhs were from the 13 blocks in the Sundarbans settlements.

=== Banking ===
In 2013–14, the Bishnupur II CD block had offices of 14 commercial banks and 1 gramin banks.

=== Backward Regions Grant Fund ===
The South 24 Parganas district is listed as a backward region and receives financial support from the Backward Regions Grant Fund. The fund, created by the Government of India, is designed to redress regional imbalances in development. As of 2012, 272 districts across the country were listed under this scheme. The list includes 11 districts of West Bengal.

== Transport ==
Bishnupur II CD block has 11 originating/ terminating bus routes. The nearest railway station is 17 km from the block headquarters.

== Education ==
In 2013–14, the Bishnupur II CD block had 107 primary schools with 9,223 students, 3 middle schools with 504 students, 11 high schools with 5,356 students and 12 higher secondary schools with 10,584 students. Bishnupur II CD block had 1 general degree college with 2,281 students, 1 technical/ professional institution with 199 students and 320 institutions for special and non-formal education with 11,561 students.

See also – Education in India

According to the 2011 census, in the Bishnupur II CD block, amongst the 52 inhabited villages, 2 villages did not have a school, 28 villages had two or more primary schools, 16 villages had at least 1 primary and 1 middle school and 13 villages had at least 1 middle and 1 secondary school.

Vidyanagar College was established at Vidyanagar in 1963.

== Healthcare ==
Certain areas of the South 24 Parganas district have been identified where ground water is affected by Arsenic Contamination. High levels of arsenic in ground water were found in twelve CD blocks of the district. Water samples collected from tubewells in the affected places contained arsenic above the normal level (10 micrograms per litre as specified by the World Health Organization). The affected CD blocks are Baruipur, Bhangar I, Bhangar II, Bishnupur I, Bishnupur II, Basanti, Budge Budge II, Canning I, Canning II, Sonarpur, Magrahat II and Jaynagar I.

In 2014, the Bishnupur II CD block had 1 block primary health centre, 1 primary health centre and 18 private nursing homes with total 215 beds and 39 doctors (excluding private bodies). It had 26 family welfare subcentres. 1,774 patients were treated indoor and 131,275 patients were treated outdoor in the hospitals, health centres and subcentres of the CD block.

According to the 2011 census, in the Bishnupur II CD block, 2 villages had primary health centres, 11 villages had primary health subcentres, 7 villages had maternity and child welfare centres, 11 villages had medicine shops and out of the 52 inhabited villages 19 villages had no medical facilities.

Amtala Rural Hospital at Amtala with 50 beds is the major government medical facility in the Bishnupur II CD block. There are primary health centres at Samali (PO Nahazari) (with 10 beds) and Moukhali (PO Charshyamdas) (with 6 beds).
