= Purnendu Sekhar Naskar =

Indian politician (1921–1993)

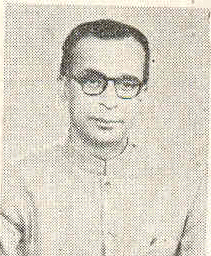

Member of Parliament, Lok Sabha
- In office 1962–1967
- Succeeded by: Kansari Halder
- Constituency: Mathurapur, West Bengal
- In office 1952-1962
- Succeeded by: Sudhansu Bhusan Das
- Constituency: Diamond Harbour

Personal details
- Born: March 1921 Calcutta, Bengal Presidency, British India
- Died: 24 August 1993 (aged 72)
- Party: Indian National Congress
- Spouse: Suroma

Purnendu Sekhar Naskar (March 1921 – 24 August 1993) was an Indian politician belonging to the Indian National Congress.He was elected from Mathurapur, and Diamond Harbour, West Bengal to the Lok Sabha, lower house of the Parliament of India. Naskar died on 24 August 1993, at the age of 72.
