= Amal Datta =

Indian politician

Member of Parliament, Lok Sabha
- In office 1982-1996
- Preceded by: Jyotirmoy Basu
- Succeeded by: Samik Lahiri
- Constituency: Diamond Harbour

Personal details
- Born: 12 August 1933 Calcutta, Bengal Presidency, British India
- Died: 20 October 2017 (aged 84)
- Party: CPI(M)
- Other political affiliations: Communist Party of India
- Spouse: Arti Datta

Amal Datta was an Indian politician. He was elected to the Lok Sabha, lower house of the Parliament of India from the Diamond Harbour constituency of West Bengal asa member of Communist Party of India (Marxist). He was the nephew of Jyoti Basu.
