= Sonali Guha =

Indian politician (born 1968)

Member of the West Bengal Legislative Assembly
- In office 14 May 2001 – 4 May 2021
- Preceded by: Jyoti Basu
- Succeeded by: Mohan Chandra Naskar
- Constituency: Satgachhia

Deputy Speaker of the West Bengal Legislative Assembly
- In office 2011–2016

Personal details
- Born: 27 December 1968 (age 57)
- Party: Bharatiya Janata Party (2021–present)
- Other political affiliations: Trinamool Congress (1998–2021)
- Occupation: Politician

Sonali Guha (born 27 December 1968) is an Indian politician from the state of West Bengal. Guha is a Bharatiya Janata Party politician. She was elected to the West Bengal Legislative Assembly from Satgachhia for four terms to the West Bengal Legislative Assembly and was the first female deputy speaker of the West Bengal Legislative Assembly as a member of the Trinamool Congress. Later she joined Bharatiya Janata Party after she was denied a ticket to contest the 2021 assembly elections.

== Early life and education ==
Sonali Guha was born 27 December 1968 in Kolkata. She attended the University of Calcutta and graduated in science from Charuchandra College.

== Political career ==
Guha took to politics at an early age and was a close aide to Mamata Banerjee. Between 2001 and 2003, on instructions from Mamata Banerjee, Guha intervened in the defense of squatters that were being evicted from the banks of Tolly's Nullah and Gobindapur railway colony.

Guha was first elected to the West Bengal Legislative Assembly in 2001 from the Satgachhia in TMC ticket. She defeated Gokul Bairagi of the CPI(M), by about 6,000 votes. Her victory was significant as the seat had been held for five terms by former Chief Minister Jyoti Basu, since 1977. But, Basu decided not to contest the 2001 election for health reasons.

In the 2006 assembly election Guha defeated Kabita Kayal of the Communist Party of India (Marxist) by about 6,000 votes. She was elected as the first woman deputy speaker of the West Bengal Legislative Assembly.

Guha was re-elected to the West Bengal Legislative Assembly in 2011. This time her opponent was Barun Naskar from the Communist Party of India (Marxist), whom she defeated by about 18,000 votes.

In the 2016 assembly election, Guha won the Satgachhia (Vidhan Sabha constituency) seat for the fourth time, defeating Paramita Ghosh of the Communist Party of India (Marxist) by about a margin of 17,500 votes.

== Personal life ==
Guha is married to Partha Bose and the couple have one daughter.
