= Sudhansu Bhushan Das =

Indian politician (1915–1986)

- In office 1962–1967
- Succeeded by: Jyotirmoy Basu
- Constituency: Diamond Harbour

Personal details
- Born: 17 April 1915 Mirzapur, Diamond Harbour, Bengal Presidency, British India
- Died: 1986 (aged 70–71)
- Party: Indian National Congress
- Spouse: Lilabati Das

Sudhansu Bhushan Das (17 April 1915 – 1986) was an Indian politician belonging to the Indian National Congress. He was elected from Diamond Harbour, West Bengal to the Lok Sabha, lower house of the Parliament of India. Das died in 1986.
