= Mohan Chandra Naskar =

Indian politician

Member of the West Bengal Legislative Assembly
- In office 2 May 2021 – 5 May 2026
- Preceded by: Sonali Guha
- Succeeded by: Agniswar Naskar
- Constituency: Satgachhia

Personal details
- Born: January 15, 1958 (age 68)
- Party: Trinamool Congress
- Profession: Politician

Mohan Chandra Naskar (born 15 January 1958) is an Indian politician member of Trinamool Congress. He is an MLA, elected from the Satgachhia constituency in the 2021 West Bengal Legislative Assembly election.
