= Kamal Basu =

Indian politician (1918–2013)

Kamal Kumar Basu (22 August 1918 – 21 January 2013) was a Bengali Indian politician who had served as a Mayor of Kolkata, India between 1985 and 1990.

== Early life and education ==
Born to a progressive family, that included his grandfather, barrister Bhupendra Nath Bose, a former president of the Indian National Congress, he had studied economics at the Scottish Church College, and eventually earned a master's degree in political science from the University of Calcutta, where he subsequently studied law. He had joined a solicitor firm BN Basu & Co after passing law.

== Career in politics and social life ==
At an early age, he joined the Communist Party of India and became a Member of Parliament for the Lok Sabha, from West Bengal's Diamond Harbour in the South 24 Parganas district in 1952. In 1964, when CPI split up, he joined the Communist Party of India (Marxist). He was associated with the CPI(M) for over four decades.

== Later life ==
He became Calcutta's mayor in 1985. He was also actively associated with the establishment of Salt Lake Stadium, as a founder secretary of the society for sports and stadium. He used to make on-the-spot supervisions during its construction. He was also a patron of the Mohun Bagan club.

During the Sino-Indian War of 1962, he fought a legal battle on behalf of his Communist Party of India comrades who had been detained by the Government of India, on suspected loyalties.

His efforts were instrumental in saving the Shobhabazar Rajbari, often described as the native Town Hall, from destruction.

== Death ==
He died in a private nursing home on 21 January 2013 at the age of 94.
