= Bishnupur I =

Community Development Block in West Bengal, India

- Community Development Block
- Location of Bishnupur I community development block in South 24 Parganas district
- Coordinates: 22.3812°N 88.2680°E
- Country: India
- State: West Bengal
- Division: Presidency
- District: South 24 Parganas
- Subdivision: Alipore Sadar
- Headquarters: Bishnupur

Government
  - Gram Panchayats: Amgachhia, Andhar Manik, Bhandaria Kastekumari, Dakshin Gauripur Chakdhir, Julpia, Keoradanga, Kulerdari, Panakua, Paschim Bishnupur, Purba Bishnupur, Raskhali
  - Lok Sabha constituencies: Diamond Harbour
  - Vidhan Sabha constituencies: Bishnupur

Area
  - Total: 116.36 km^{2} (44.93 sq mi)

Population (2011)
  - Total: 232,365
  - Density: 1,996.9/km^{2} (5,172.1/sq mi)
  - Urban: 27,980

Demographics
  - Literacy: 78.31 per cent
  - Sex ratio: 957 ♂/♀

Languages
  - Official: Bengali
  - Additional official: English
- Time zone: UTC+05:30 (IST)
- Website: s24pgs.gov.in

Bishnupur I is a community development block that forms an administrative division in Alipore Sadar subdivision of South 24 Parganas district in the Indian state of West Bengal.

== Geography ==

Bishnupur I CD block is located at 22.3812°N 88.2680°E. It has an average elevation of 9 metres (30 ft).

Bishnupur I CD block is bounded by the Thakurpukur Maheshtala CD block and the Kolkata district in the north, the Sonarpur and Baruipur CD blocks in the east, the Magrahat I and Magrahat II CD blocks in the south and the Bishnupur II CD block in the west.

South 24 Parganas district is divided into two distinct physiographic zones: the marine-riverine delta in the north and the marine delta zone in the south. As the sea receded southwards, in the sub-recent geological period, a large low-lying plain got exposed. Both tidal inflows and the rivers have deposited sediments in this plain. The periodical collapse of both the natural levees and man-made embankments speed up the process of filling up the depressions containing brackish water wetlands. The marine delta in the south is formed of interlacing tidal channels. As non-saline water for irrigation is scarce, agriculture is monsoon-dominated. Some parts of the wetlands are still preserved for raising fish.

Bishnupur I CD block has an area of 116.36 km^{2}. It has 1 panchayat samity, 11 gram panchayats, 168 gram sansads (village councils), 87 mouzas and 84 inhabited villages, as per the District Statistical Handbook for South Twenty-four Parganas. Bishnupur police station serves this CD Block. Headquarters of this CD block is at Bishnupur.

Gram panchayats of Bishnupur I CD block/panchayat samiti are: Amgachhia, Andhar Manik, Bhandaria Kastekumari, Dakshin Gauripur Chakdhir, Julpia, Keoradanga, Kulerdari, Panakua, Paschim Bishnupur, Purba Bishnupur and Raskhali.

== Demographics ==
=== Population ===
According to the 2011 Census of India, Bishnupur I CD block had a total population of 232,365, of which 204,385 were rural and 27,980 were urban. There were 118,717 (51%) males and 113,648 (49%) females. There were 26,993 persons in the age range of 0 to 6 years. Scheduled Castes numbered 108,432 (46.66%) and Scheduled Tribes numbered 100 (0.04%).

According to the 2001 Census of India, the Bishnupur I CD block had a total population of 206,276, out of which 106,471 were males and 99,805 were females. Bishnupur I CD block registered a population growth of 15.33% during the 1991-2001 decade. Decadal growth for South 24 Parganas district was 20.89%. Decadal growth in West Bengal was 17.84%. Scheduled Castes at 100,539 formed around one-half the population. Scheduled Tribes numbered 1,642.

Census Towns in the Bishnupur I CD block (2011 census figures in brackets): Daulatpur (6,568), Bhasa (5,559), Bishnupur (5,030) and Kanyanagar (10,823).

Large villages (with 4,000+ population) in the Bishnupur I CD block (2011 census figures in brackets): Khariberia (4,007), Bagi (7,235), Bakeswar (4,940), Amgachhi (10,179), Gandhabaduli (4,194), Dakshin Gouripur (9,064), Kasthamahal (5,156), Kalmikhali (4,804), Keoradanga (4,205), Raskhali (9,399) and Andharmanik (6,676).

Other villages in the Bishnupur I CD block include (2011 census figures in brackets): Chakdhir (1,239), Panakua (3,793), Julpia (2,968), Bhandaria (3,883), Kastikumari (3,100), Kulerdari (2,511) and Doulatabad (3,649).

=== Literacy ===
According to the 2011 census, the total number of literate persons in Bishnupur I CD block was 160,871 (78.21% of the population over 6 years) out of which males numbered 89,231 (85.03% of the male population over 6 years) and females numbered 71,640 (71.29% of the female population over 6 years). The gender disparity (the difference between female and male literacy rates) was 13.74%.

According to the 2011 Census of India, literacy in South 24 Parganas district was 77.51% Literacy in West Bengal was 77.08% in 2011. Literacy in India in 2011 was 74.04%.

According to the 2001 Census of India, Bishnupur I CD Block had a total literacy of 71.93% for the 6+ age group. While male literacy was 82.47%, female literacy trailed at 60.61%. South 24 Parganas district had a total literacy of 69.45%, male literacy being 79.19% and female literacy being 59.01%.

See also – List of West Bengal districts ranked by literacy rate

Literacy in CD blocks of
South 24 Parganas district
Alipore Sadar subdivision
Bishnupur I – 78.33%
Bishnupur II – 81.37%
Budge Budge I – 80.57%
Budge Budge II – 79.13%
Thakurpukur Maheshtala – 83.54%
Baruipur subdivision
Baruipur – 76.46%
Bhangar I – 72.06%
Bhangar II – 74.49%
Jaynagar I – 73.17%
Jaynagar II – 69.71%
Kultali – 69.37%
Sonarpur – 79.70%
Canning subdivision
Basanti – 68.32%
Canning I – 70.76%
Canning II – 66.51%
Gosaba – 78.98%
Diamond Harbour subdivision
Diamond Harbour I – 75.72%
Diamond Harbour II – 76.91%
Falta – 77.17%
Kulpi – 75.49%
Magrahat I – 73.82%
Magrahat II – 77.41%
Mandirbazar – 75.89%
Mathurapur I – 73.93%
Mathurapur II – 77.77%
Kakdwip subdivision
Kakdwip – 77.93%
Namkhana – 85.72
Patharpratima – 82.11%
Sagar – 84.21%
Source: 2011 Census: CD Block Wise
Primary Census Abstract Data

=== Language ===
Languages of Bishnupur I CD block (2011)
1. Bengali (99.2%)
2. Hindi (0.79%)
3. Urdu (0.02%)
4. Others (0.01%)

At the time of the 2011 census, 99.18% of the population spoke Bengali, 0.79% Hindi and 0.02% Urdu as their first language.

=== Religion ===
Religion in Bishnupur I CD block (2011)
Hinduism	63.46%
Islam	31.04%
Christianity	5.27%
Other or not stated	0.23%

In the 2011 Census of India, Hindus numbered 147,636 and formed 63.46% of the population in Bishnupur I CD block. Muslims numbered 72,219 and formed 31.04% of the population. Others numbered 12,780 and formed 5.50% of the population. Amongst the others, Christians numbered 12,235.

The proportion of Hindus in South Twenty-four Parganas district has declined from 76.0% in 1961 to 63.2% in 2011. The proportion of Muslims in South Twenty-four Parganas district has increased from 23.4% to 35.6% during the same period. Christians formed 0.8% in 2011.

== Rural poverty ==
As per the Human Development Report for the South 24 Parganas district, published in 2009, in the Bishnupur I CD block the percentage of households below poverty line was 16.59%, a comparatively low level of poverty. As per rural household survey in 2005, the proportion of households in the South 24 Parganas with poverty rates below poverty line was 34.11%, way above the state and national poverty ratios. The poverty rates were very high in the Sundarbans settlements with all thirteen CD blocks registering poverty ratios above 30% and eight CD blocks had more than 40% of the population in the BPL category.

== Economy ==
=== Livelihood ===
Livelihood
in Bishnupur I CD block
1. Cultivators (9.90%)
2. Agricultural labourers (18.6%)
3. Household industries (16.3%)
4. Other Workers (55.2%)

In the Bishnupur I CD block in 2011, among the class of total workers, cultivators numbered 8,342 and formed 9.90%, agricultural labourers numbered 15,687 and formed 18.62%, household industry workers numbered 13,718 and formed 16.28% and other workers numbered 46,493 and formed 55.19%. Total workers numbered 84,240 and formed 36.25% of the total population, and non-workers numbered 145,125 and formed 63.75% of the population.

The District Human Development Report points out that in the blocks of region situated in the close proximity of the Kolkata metropolis, overwhelming majority are involved in the non-agricultural sector for their livelihood. On the other hand, in the Sundarbans settlements, overwhelming majority are dependent on agriculture. In the intermediate region, there is again predominance of the non-agricultural sector. Though the region is not very close to Kolkata, many places are well connected and some industrial/ economic development has taken place.

Note: In the census records a person is considered a cultivator, if the person is engaged in cultivation/ supervision of land owned by self/government/institution. When a person who works on another person's land for wages in cash or kind or share, is regarded as an agricultural labourer. Household industry is defined as an industry conducted by one or more members of the family within the household or village, and one that does not qualify for registration as a factory under the Factories Act. Other workers are persons engaged in some economic activity other than cultivators, agricultural labourers and household workers. It includes factory, mining, plantation, transport and office workers, those engaged in business and commerce, teachers, entertainment artistes and so on.

=== Infrastructure ===
There are 84 inhabited villages in the Bishnupur I CD block, as per the District Census Handbook, South Twenty-four Parganas, 2011. 100% villages have power supply. 83 villages (98.81%) have drinking water supply. 19 villages (22.62%) have post offices. 78 villages (92.86%) have telephones (including landlines, public call offices and mobile phones). 48 villages (57.14%) have pucca (paved) approach roads and 25 villages (29.76%) have transport communication (includes bus service, rail facility and navigable waterways). 1 village (1.19%) has an agricultural credit society and 4 villages (4.76%) have banks.

=== Agriculture ===
South 24 Parganas had played a significant role in the Tebhaga movement launched by the Communist Party of India in 1946. Subsequently, Operation Barga was aimed at securing tenancy rights for the peasants. In Bishnupur I CD block 205.92 acres of land was acquired and vested. Out of this 87.77 acres or 42.62% of the vested land was distributed. The total number of patta (document) holders was 424.

According to the District Human Development Report, agriculture is an important source of livelihood in South Twentyfour Parganas district. The amount of cultivable land per agricultural worker is only 0.41 hectare in the district. Moreover, the irrigation facilities have not been extended to a satisfactory scale. Agriculture mostly remains a mono-cropped activity.

According to the District Census Handbook, the saline soil of the district is unfit for cultivation, but the non-salty lands are very fertile. While rice is the main food crop, jute is the main cash crop.

In 2013-14, there were 45 fertiliser depots, 27 seed stores and 47 fair price shops in the Bishnupur I CD block.

In 2013-14, the Bishnupur I CD block produced 752 tonnes of Aman paddy, the main winter crop from 1,021 hectares, 22,468 tonnes of Boro paddy (spring crop) from 7,158 hectares.

=== Irrigation ===
In the Bishnupur I CD block, in 2013-14, 91.59 hectares were irrigated by river lift irrigation.

=== Pisciculture ===
In the Bishnupur I CD block, in 2013-14, net area under effective pisciculture was 376 hectares, engaging 5,065 persons in the profession, and with an approximate annual production of 23,120 quintals.

Pisciculture is an important source of employment in the South 24 Parganas district. As of 2001, more than 4.5 lakh people were engaged in Pisciculture. Out of this 2.57 lakhs were from the 13 blocks in the Sundarbans settlements.

=== Banking ===
In 2013-14, the Bishnupur I CD block had offices of 5 commercial banks and 5 gramin banks.

=== Backward Regions Grant Fund ===
The South 24 Parganas district is listed as a backward region and receives financial support from the Backward Regions Grant Fund. The fund, created by the Government of India, is designed to redress regional imbalances in development. As of 2012, 272 districts across the country were listed under this scheme. The list includes 11 districts of West Bengal.

== Transport ==
Bishnupur I CD block has 14 originating/ terminating bus routes. The nearest railway station is 14 km from the block headquarters.

== Education ==
In 2013-14, the Bishnupur I CD block had 108 primary schools with 10,318 students, 17 middle schools with 1,936 students, 5 high schools with 1,188 students and 13 higher secondary schools with 10,586 students. The Bishnupur I CD block had 3 technical/ professional institutions with 1,806 students and 337 institutions for special and non-formal education with 11,557 students.

See also – Education in India

According to the 2011 census, in the Bishnupur I CD block, among the 84 inhabited villages, 4 villages did not have a school, 32 villages had two or more primary schools, 31 villages had at least 1 primary and 1 middle school and 19 villages had at least 1 middle and 1 secondary school.

== Healthcare ==
Certain areas of the South 24 Parganas district have been identified where ground water is affected by Arsenic Contamination. High levels of arsenic in ground water were found in the twelve CD blocks of the district. Water samples collected from tubewells in the affected places contained arsenic above the normal level (10 micrograms per litre as specified by the World Health Organization). The affected CD blocks are Baruipur, Bhangar I, Bhangar II, Bishnupur I, Bishnupur II, Basanti, Budge Budge II, Canning I, Canning II, Sonarpur, Magrahat II and Jaynagar I.

In 2014, the Bishnupur I CD block had 1 rural hospital, 1 block primary health centre, 2 primary health centres and 5 private nursing homes with total 126 beds and 21 doctors (excluding private bodies). It had 28 family welfare subcentres. 26,156 patients were treated indoor and 209,729 patients were treated outdoor in the hospitals, health centres and subcentres of the CD block.

According to the 2011 census, in the Bishnupur I CD block, 7 villages had a community health centres, 2 villages had primary health centres, 34 villages had primary health subcentres, 2 villages had maternity and child welfare centres, 18 villages had medicine shops and out of the 84 inhabited villages 29 villages had no medical facilities.

Chandi Doulatabad Block Primary Health Centre at Doulatabad (PO Nepalganj) with 10 beds is the major government medical facility in the Bishnupur I CD block. There are primary health centres at Julpia (PO Andharmanik) (with 6 beds) and Amgachhia (PO Nepalganj) (with 10 beds).
