= Jyotirmoy Basu =

Indian politician (1920–1982)

The Honourable Jyotirmoy Basu

Member of Parliament, Lok Sabha
- In office 1967–1982
- Preceded by: Sudhansu Bhusan Das
- Succeeded by: Amal Dutta
- Constituency: Diamond Harbour

Personal details
- Born: 18 December 1920 Calcutta, Bengal Presidency, British India
- Died: 12 January 1982 (aged 61) Jaipur, Rajasthan
- Party: CPI(M)
- Other political affiliations: Communist Party of India
- Spouse: Anima Basu
- Children: 1 son

Jyotirmoy Basu (18 December 1920 – 12 January 1982) was an Indian politician. He was elected to the Lok Sabha, lower house of the Parliament of India from the Diamond Harbour constituency of West Bengal in 1967, 1971, 1977 and 1980 as a member of the Communist Party of India (Marxist).
