= Dilip Mondal =

Indian politician

Minister of State Government of West Bengal
- In office 10 May 2021 – 7 May 2026
- Minister: Firhad Hakim
- Governor: Jagdeep Dhankhar; La. Ganesan (additional charge); C. V. Ananda Bose; R. N. Ravi
- Chief Minister: Mamata Banerjee
- Department: Transport

Member of the West Bengal Legislative Assembly
- Incumbent
- Assumed office 2011
- Constituency: Bishnupur
- In office 2001–2006
- Constituency: Bishnupur Purba

Personal details
- Born: South 24 Parganas, West Bengal
- Profession: Social Worker

Dilip Mondal is an Indian politician Member of Legislative Assembly from Bishnupur, South 24 Parganas (Vidhan Sabha constituency), South 24 Parganas, West Bengal. He won the election, in 2011 being an All India Trinamool Congress candidate and being the Member of West Bengal Legislative Assembly from Bishnupur, South 24 Parganas (Vidhan Sabha constituency)- AC No-146. On 27th may 2026, he was arrested from puri by STF.
