= Agniswar Naskar =

Indian politician (born 1979)

Agniswar Naskar (born 1979) is an Indian politician from West Bengal. He is a member of the West Bengal Legislative Assembly from the Satgachhia Assembly constituency in South 24 Parganas district representing the Bharatiya Janata Party.

== Early life and education ==
Naskar is from Satgachhia, South 24 Parganas district, West Bengal. He is the son of Sankar Chandra Naskar. He completed his BCom at a college affiliated with University of Calcutta in 2001. He runs his own business. He declared assets worth Rs.2 crore in his affidavit to the Election Commission of India.

== Career ==
Naskar won the Satgachhia Assembly constituency representing the Bharatiya Janata Party in the 2026 West Bengal Legislative Assembly election. He polled 1,11,023 votes and defeated his nearest rival, Somashree Betal of the All India Trinamool Congress, by a margin of 401 votes.
