= Doultabad, Bishnupur =

Doultabad
- Village
- Location in West Bengal Location in India
- Coordinates: 22.3578°N 88.2998°E
- Country: India
- State: West Bengal
- District: South 24 Parganas
- CD block: Bishnupur I

Area
  - Total: 1.30 km^{2} (0.50 sq mi)
- Elevation: 9 m (30 ft)

Population (2011)
  - Total: 3,649
  - Density: 2,810/km^{2} (7,270/sq mi)

Languages
  - Official: Bengali
  - Additional official: English
- Time zone: UTC+5:30 (IST)
- PIN: 743503
- Telephone code: +91 33
- Vehicle registration: WB-19 to WB-22, WB-95 to WB-99
- Lok Sabha constituency: Diamond Harbour
- Vidhan Sabha constituency: Bishnupur (SC)
- Website: www.s24pgs.gov.in

Doultabad is a village within the jurisdiction of the Bishnupur police station in the Bishnupur I CD block in the Alipore Sadar subdivision of the South 24 Parganas district in the Indian state of West Bengal.

== Geography ==
Cities and towns in the eastern part of Alipore Sadar subdivision (including Bishnupur I & II CD blocks) in South 24 Parganas district
M: municipal city/ town, CT: census town, R: rural/ urban centre, N: Neighbourhood
Owing to space constraints in the small map, the actual locations in a larger map may vary slightly

=== Area overview ===
The Alipore Sadar subdivision is the most urbanized part of the South 24 Parganas district. 59.85% of the population lives in the urban areas and 40.15% lives in the rural areas. In the southern portion of the subdivision (shown in the map alongside) there are 15 census towns. The entire district is situated in the Ganges Delta and the subdivision, on the east bank of the Hooghly River, is an alluvial stretch, with industrial development.

Note: The map alongside presents some of the notable locations in the subdivision. All places marked in the map are linked in the larger full screen map.

=== Location ===
Doultabad is located at 22°21′28″N 88°17′59″E. It has an average elevation of 9 metres (30 ft).

== Demographics ==
According to the 2011 Census of India, Doultabad had a total population of 3,649, of which 1,798 (49%) were males and 1,851 (51%) were females. There were 401 persons in the age range of 0 to 6 years. The total number of literate people in Doultabad was 2,591 (79.77% of the population over 6 years).

== Transport ==
Baruipur-Amtala Road links Doultabad to the National Highway 12.

== Healthcare ==
Chandi Doultabad Block Primary Health Centre, with 10 beds, at Doultabad (PO Nepalganj), is the major government medical facility in the Bishnupur I CD block.
