= Amtala =

- Census Town
- Location in West Bengal Location in India
- Coordinates: 22.3669°N 88.2777°E
- Country: India
- State: West Bengal
- District: South 24 Parganas
- CD block: Bishnupur II

Area
  - Total: 1.53 km^{2} (0.59 sq mi)
- Elevation: 9 m (30 ft)

Population (2011)
  - Total: 8,765
  - Density: 5,730/km^{2} (14,800/sq mi)

Languages
  - Official: Bengali
  - Additional official: English
- Time zone: UTC+5:30 (IST)
- PIN: 743503
- Telephone code: +91 33
- Vehicle registration: WB-19,WB-20,WB-22,WB-95 WB-98,WB-10
- Lok Sabha constituency: Diamond Harbour
- Vidhan Sabha constituency: Satgachhia
- Website: www.s24pgs.gov.in

Amtala is a census town within the jurisdiction of the Bishnupur police station in the Bishnupur II CD block in the Alipore Sadar subdivision of the South 24 Parganas district in the Indian state of West Bengal.

== Geography ==
Cities and towns in the eastern part of Alipore Sadar subdivision (including Bishnupur I & II CD blocks) in South 24 Parganas district
M: municipal city/ town, CT: census town, R: rural/ urban centre, N: neighbourhood
Owing to space constraints in the small map, the actual locations in a larger map may vary slightly

=== Area overview ===
The Alipore Sadar subdivision is the most urbanized part of the South 24 Parganas district. 59.85% of the population lives in the urban areas and 40.15% lives in the rural areas. In the southern portion of the subdivision (shown in the map alongside) there are 15 census towns. The entire district is situated in the Ganges Delta and the subdivision, on the east bank of the Hooghly River, is an alluvial stretch, with industrial development.

Note: The map alongside presents some of the notable locations in the subdivision. All places marked in the map are linked in the larger full screen map.

=== Location ===
Amtala is located at 22°22′01″N 88°16′40″E. It has an average elevation of 9 metres (30 ft).

Bishnupur, Kanyanagar, Amtala, Ramkrishnapur, Kriparampur and Chak Enayetnagar (a little away) form a cluster of census towns, as per the map of the Bishnupur I CD block on page 207 and the map of the Bishnupur II CD block on page 233 of the District Census Handbook 2011 for the South 24 Parganas.

== Demographics ==
According to the 2011 Census of India, Amtala had a total population of 8,765, of which 4,416 (50%) were males and 4,349 (50%) were females. There were 829 persons in the age range of 0 to 6 years. The total number of literates was 6,896 (86.89% of the population over 6 years).

== Infrastructure ==
According to the District Census Handbook 2011, Amtala covered an area of 1.53 km^{2}. Among the civic amenities, it had 22 km roads with both open and covered drains. The protected water supply involved over-head tank. It had 200 domestic electric connections, 1,500 commercial connections and 100 road light points. Among the medical facilities it had 2 charitable hospitals/ nursing homes and 2 medicine shops. Among the educational facilities it had were 6 primary schools, the nearest middle, secondary and senior secondary schools at Pallishree 1 km away, the nearest general degree college at Vidyanagar 5 km away. It had 4 recognised shorthand, typewriting and vocational training institutes, 1 non-formal education centre (Sarba Siksha Abhiyan). Among the social, recreational and cultural facilities, it had 1 public library. Three important commodities it produced were dry flowers, plywood and brush. It had branches of 10 nationalised banks, 9 private commercial banks, 1 co-operative bank and 1 non-agricultural credit society.

== Transport ==
Amtala is on the National Highway 12. Amtala is connected to Kolkata by Bus Route No.210, 235, SD 18, 83 etc. And towards Diamondharbour, Raychak, Falta, etc. by same Bus routs. Connected to Baruipur By SD29 Bus. And To Budge Budge by Auto rickshaw.

The Newly launched Volvo Service by WBTC (Route No. VS 15A), from Amtala to Dakshineswar, connects Amtala directly to the different parts of the Kolkata City like Salt Lake, New Town and The Kolkata International Airport.

== Education ==
Udairampur Pallisree Sikshayatan is a higher secondary school established in 1946.

Central Model School, Amtala, is a higher secondary school affiliated to the Central Board of Secondary Education - CBSE, Delhi.

ST. JOSEPH'S BRIGHT SCHOOL, Amtala, is a higher secondary school affiliated to the West Bengal Board of Secondary Education - WBBSE, West Bengal.

== Healthcare ==
Amtala Rural Hospital, with 50 beds, at Amtala, is the major government medical facility in the Bishnupur II CD block.

== Prominent Peoples Lived Here ==
1.Abhijit Das Bobby, BJP State Committee & Railway Board Member

2. Dilip Mondal, Cabinet Minister Govt of West Bengal

3.Mohan Chandra Naskar MLA, Satgaachia Vidhansabha
