= Bishnupur, South 24 Parganas =

Bishnupur
- Census Town
- Location in West Bengal Location in India
- Coordinates: 22.3812°N 88.2680°E
- Country: India
- State: West Bengal
- District: South 24 Parganas
- CD block: Bishnupur I

Area
  - Total: 1.81 km^{2} (0.70 sq mi)
- Elevation: 9 m (30 ft)

Population (2011)
  - Total: 5,030
  - Density: 2,780/km^{2} (7,200/sq mi)

Languages
  - Official: Bengali
  - Additional official: English
- Time zone: UTC+5:30 (IST)
- PIN: 743503
- Telephone code: +91 33
- Vehicle registration: WB-19 to WB-22, WB-95 to WB-99
- Lok Sabha constituency: Diamond Harbour
- Vidhan Sabha constituency: Bishnupur (SC)
- Website: www.s24pgs.gov.in

Bishnupur is a census town within the jurisdiction of the Bishnupur police station in the Bishnupur I CD block in the Alipore Sadar subdivision of the South 24 Parganas district in the Indian state of West Bengal.

== Geography ==
Cities and towns in the eastern part of Alipore Sadar subdivision (including Bishnupur I & II CD blocks) in South 24 Parganas district
M: municipal city/ town, CT: census town, R: rural/ urban centre, N: neighbourhood
Owing to space constraints in the small map, the actual locations in a larger map may vary slightly

=== Area overview ===
Alipore Sadar subdivision is a most urbanized part of the South 24 Parganas district. 59.85% of the population lives in the urban areas and 40.15% lives in the rural areas. In the southern portion of the subdivision (shown in the map alongside) there are 15 census towns. The entire district is situated in the Ganges Delta and the subdivision, on the east bank of the Hooghly River, is an alluvial stretch, with industrial development.

Note: The map alongside presents some of the notable locations in the subdivision. All places marked in the map are linked in the larger full screen map.

=== Location ===
Bishnupur is located at 22°22′52″N 88°16′05″E. It has an average elevation of 9 metres (30 ft).

Bishnupur, Kanyanagar, Amtala, Ramkrishnapur, Kriparampur and Chak Enayetnagar (a little away) form a cluster of census towns, as per the map of the Bishnupur I CD block on page 207 and the map of the Bishnupur II CD block on page 233 of the District Census Handbook 2011 for the South 24 Parganas.

== Demographics ==
According to the 2011 Census of India, Bishnupur had a total population of 5,030, of which 2,561 (51%) were males and 2,469 (49%) were females. There were 431 persons in the age range of 0 to 6 years. The total number of literate persons was 4,099 (89.13% of the population over 6 years).

According to the 2001 Census of India, Bishnupur had a population of 4,529. Males constitute 53% of the population and females 47%. It has an average literacy rate of 82%, higher than the national average of 59.5%; with male literacy of 86% and female literacy of 77%. 9% of the population is under 6 years of age.

== Civic Administration ==
=== Police station ===
Bishnupur police station is located in Bishnupur. Bishnupur PS covers an area of 211 km^{2}, spread over parts of the Bishnupur I, the Bishnupur II and the Thakurpukur Maheshtala CD block.

=== CD block HQ ===
The headquarters of the Bishnupur I CD block are located at Bishnupur.

== Infrastructure ==
According to the District Census Handbook 2011, Bishnupur covered an area of 1.81 km^{2}. Among the civic amenities, the protected water supply involved over-head tank and service reservoir. It had 1,100 domestic electric connections. Among the medical facilities it had 1 dispensary/ health centre, 4 charitable hospitals/ nursing homes and 6 medicine shops. Among the educational facilities it had were 5 primary schools, 5 middle schools, 3 secondary schools, 2 senior secondary schools and a general degree college at Vidyanagar located close by. It had 1 recognised shorthand, typewriting and vocational training centre. Among the social, recreational and cultural facilities it had 1 orphanage home, 1 old age home and 1 cinema theatre. Important commodities it produced were soft toys and muri (puffed rice).

== Transport ==
Bishnupur is on the National Highway 12.

== Education ==
Bishnupur Siksha Sangha is a Bengali-medium coeducational institution established in 1926. It has facilities for teaching from class V to Class XII.

Bishnupur Grihasree Sikshayatan for Girls is a higher secondary school.

Mount Litera Zee School, established in 2007 at Khariberia is affiliated to the Central Board of Secondary Education – CBSE, Delhi.

Khariberia Vivekananda Vidyapith is a Bengali-medium boys only institution established in 1960. It has facilities for teaching from class V to class XII.

Vidyanagar College was established at Vidyanagar in 1963.

== Healthcare ==
Chandi Doulatabad Block Primary Health Centre, with 10 beds, at Doulatabad (PO Nepalganj), is the major government medical facility in the Bishnupur I CD block.
