= Vidyanagar, Bishnupur =

Vidyanagar
- Village
- Location in West Bengal Location in India
- Coordinates: 22.3863°N 88.2371°E
- Country: India
- State: West Bengal
- District: South 24 Parganas
- CD block: Bishnupur II
- Elevation: 9 m (30 ft)

Languages
  - Official: Bengali
  - Additional official: English
- Time zone: UTC+5:30 (IST)
- PIN: 743503
- Telephone code: +91 33
- Vehicle registration: WB-19 to WB-22, WB-95 to WB-99
- Lok Sabha constituency: Diamond Harbour
- Vidhan Sabha constituency: Satgachhia
- Website: www.s24pgs.gov.in

Vidyanagar is a village within the jurisdiction of the Bishnupur police station in the Bishnupur II CD block in the Alipore Sadar subdivision of the South 24 Parganas district in the Indian state of West Bengal.

== Geography ==
Cities and towns in the eastern part of Alipore Sadar subdivision (including Bishnupur I & II CD blocks) in South 24 Parganas district
M: municipal city/ town, CT: census town, R: rural/ urban centre, N: neighbourhood
Owing to space constraints in the small map, the actual locations in a larger map may vary slightly

=== Area overview ===
The Alipore Sadar subdivision is the most urbanized part of the South 24 Parganas district. 59.85% of the population lives in the urban areas and 40.15% lives in the rural areas. In the southern portion of the subdivision (shown in the map alongside) there are 15 census towns. The entire district is situated in the Ganges Delta and the subdivision, on the east bank of the Hooghly River, is an alluvial stretch, with industrial development.

Note: The map alongside presents some of the notable locations in the subdivision. All places marked in the map are linked in the larger full screen map.

=== Location ===
Vidyanagar is located at 22°23′11″N 88°14′14″E. It has an average elevation of 9 metres (30 ft).

Vidyanagar is not identified as a separate place in 2011 census. As per the map of the Bishnupur II CD block in the District Census Handbook, it could be a part of either Chanddandaha or Maukhali.

== Transport ==
A short stretch of local roads link Vidyanagar to the National Highway 12.

== Education ==
Vidyanagar College, established in 1963, is affiliated with the University of Calcutta. It offers honours courses in Bengali, English, political science, history, philosophy, economics, physics, chemistry, mathematics, botany, zoology, and general courses in arts, science and commerce.

Vidyanagar Multipurpose School is a coeducational institution affiliated with the West Bengal Board of Secondary Education.

Vidyanagar Girls School is girls only institution affiliated with the West Board of Secondary Education.

== Healthcare ==
Amtala Rural Hospital, with 50 beds, at Amtala, is the major government medical facility in the Bishnupur II CD block.
