= Vidyanagar College =

College in West Bengal

- Type: Undergraduate college
- Established: July 29, 1963; 63 years ago
- Affiliations: University of Calcutta
- Principal: Surja Prakash Agarwala
- Location: Nibaran Dutta Road, Bara Gagan Gohalia, Vidyanagar, West Bengal, 743503, India; 22.385836°N 88.2347736°E
- Campus: Urban
- Website: Vidyanagar College
- Location within West Bengal Location within India

Vidyanagar College, established in 1963, is an undergraduate college in Vidyanagar, South 24 Parganas district, West Bengal, India. It is affiliated with the University of Calcutta.

== Departments ==
=== Science ===
- Chemistry
- Physics
- Mathematics
- Botany
- Zoology

=== Arts and Commerce ===
- Bengali
- English
- History
- Political Science
- Philosophy
- Education
- Commerce

== Accreditation ==
Vidyanagar College is recognized by the University Grants Commission (UGC).

== Notable faculty ==
- Pranab Mukherjee, 13th President of India

== See also ==
- List of colleges affiliated to the University of Calcutta
- Education in India
- Education in West Bengal
