= Bishnupur, South 24 Parganas Assembly constituency =

West Bengal Legislative Assembly constituency in South 24 Parganas district

Bishnupur
- Constituency No. 146 for the West Bengal Legislative Assembly
- Interactive Map Outlining Bishnupur Assembly Constituency

Constituency details
- Country: India
- Region: East India
- State: West Bengal
- District: South 24 Parganas
- Lok Sabha constituency: Diamond Harbour
- Established: 1951
- Total electors: 278,572
- Reservation: SC

Member of Legislative Assembly
- 18th West Bengal Legislative Assembly
- Incumbent Dilip Mondal
- Party: DTC
- Elected year: 2026

Bishnupur Assembly constituency is a Legislative Assembly constituency of South 24 Parganas district in the Indian State of West Bengal. It is reserved for Scheduled Castes.

== Overview ==
As per order of the Delimitation Commission in respect of the Delimitation of constituencies in the West Bengal, Bishnupur Assembly constituency is composed of the following:

- Bishnupur I community development block
- Thakurpukur Maheshtala community development block

Bishnupur Assembly constituency is a part of No. 21 Diamond Harbour Lok Sabha constituency.

== Members of the Legislative Assembly ==
Year	Name	Party
1952	Basanta Kumar Mal	Indian National Congress
1952	Provash Chandra Roy	Communist Party of India
1957	Provash Chandra Roy	Communist Party of India
1957	Rabindranath Roy	Communist Party of India
Bishnupur West
1962	Jugal Chandra Santra	Indian National Congress
1967	Provash Chandra Roy	Communist Party of India (Marxist)
1969	Provash Chandra Roy	Communist Party of India (Marxist)
1971	Provash Chandra Roy	Communist Party of India (Marxist)
1972	Provash Chandra Roy	Communist Party of India (Marxist)
1977	Provash Chandra Roy	Communist Party of India (Marxist)
1982	Provash Chandra Roy	Communist Party of India (Marxist)
1987	Kashi Nath Adak	Communist Party of India (Marxist)
1991	Kashi Nath Adak	Communist Party of India (Marxist)
1996	Sankar Saran Sarkar	Communist Party of India (Marxist)
2001	Subrata Bakshi	Trinamool Congress
2006	Rathin Sarkar	Communist Party of India (Marxist)
Bishnupur East
1962	Santilata Mondal	Indian National Congress
1967	Sundar Kumar Naskar	Communist Party of India (Marxist)
1969	Sundar Kumar Naskar	Communist Party of India (Marxist)
1971	Ram Krishna Bar	Indian National Congress
1972	Ram Krishna Bar	Indian National Congress
1977	Sundar Naskar	Communist Party of India (Marxist)
1982	Sundar Naskar	Communist Party of India (Marxist)
1987	Sundar Naskar	Communist Party of India (Marxist)
1991	Sundar Naskar	Communist Party of India (Marxist)
1996	Ananda Kumar Biswas	Communist Party of India (Marxist)
2001	Dilip Mondal	Trinamool Congress
2006	Bibhuti Bhushan Sarkar	Communist Party of India (Marxist)
Bishnupur
2011	Dilip Mondal	Trinamool Congress
2016	Dilip Mondal	Trinamool Congress
2021	Dilip Mondal	Trinamool Congress
2026	Dilip Mondal	Trinamool Congress

== Election results ==
=== 2026 ===
2026 West Bengal Legislative Assembly election: Bishnupur
Party	Candidate	Votes	%	±%
AITC	Dilip Mondal	132,647	52.93	▼4.53
BJP	Abhijit Sardar	95,722	38.20	▲5.50
CPI(M)	Shyamal Dal	13,338	5.32	▼2.25
INC	Arghya Naskar	3,158	1.26	New entry
Independent	Purnendu Naskar	1,728	0.69	New entry
NOTA	None of the above	1,668	0.67	▼0.11
Majority		36,925	14.73	▼10.03
Turnout		2,50,592		
AITC hold		Swing		

=== 2021 ===
2021 West Bengal Legislative Assembly election: Bishnupur
Party	Candidate	Votes	%	±%
AITC	Dilip Mondal	136,509	57.46	▲5.10
BJP	Agniswar Naskar	77,677	32.70	▲25.73
CPI(M)	Jhuma Kayal	17,995	7.57	▼29.82
BSP	Rabindranath Ranjan	2,709	1.14	▲0.36
NOTA	None of the Above	1,863	0.78	▼0.39
Independent	Uttam Naskar	817	0.34	New
Majority		58,832	24.76	▲9.79
Turnout		2,37,570	85.26	▲3.02
AITC hold		Swing		

=== 2016 ===
2016 West Bengal Legislative Assembly election: Bishnupur
Party	Candidate	Votes	%	±%
AITC	Dilip Mondal	107,129	52.36	▼1.56
CPI(M)	Aloke Sardar	76,499	37.39	▼2.44
BJP	Shyama Prasad Halder	14,264	6.97	▲3.74
NOTA	None of the Above	2,402	1.17	
BSP	Dipankar Gayen	1,594	0.78	New
Independent	Samar Kumar Biswas	1,502	0.73	New
PDS	Uttam Kumar Halder	1,203	0.59	▼0.39
Majority		30,630	14.97	▲0.88
Turnout		2,04,593	82.24	▼2.23
AITC hold		Swing		

=== 2011 ===
2011 West Bengal Legislative Assembly election: Bishnupur
Party	Candidate	Votes	%	±%
AITC	Dilip Mondal	95,912	53.92	
CPI(M)	Bibhuti Bhushan Sarkar	70,862	39.83	
BJP	Shekhar Naskar	5,745	3.23	
Independent	Prabhat Kiran Mondal	3,636	2.04	
PDS	Gopinath Naskar	1,735	0.98	
Majority		25,050	14.09	
Turnout		1,77,890	84.47	
AITC win (new seat)				

=== Legislative Assembly Elections 1977-2006 ===
From 1977 to 2006, Bishnupur Assembly constituency had two seats. In 2006, Bibhuti Bhusan Sarkar of CPI(M) won the Bishnupur Purba seat defeating his nearest rival Dilip Mondal of AITC and Rathin Sarkar of CPI(M) won the Bishnupur Paschim seat defeating his nearest rival Madan Mitra of AITC. Dilip Mondal of AITC won the Bishnupur Purba seat defeating Ananda Kumar Biswas of CPI(M) and Subrata Bakshi of AITC won the Bishnupur Paschim seat defeating Rathin Sarkar of CPI(M) in 2001. Ananda Kumar Biswas of CPI(M) won the Bishnupur Purba seat defeating Mahadeb Naskar of INC and Sankar Saran Naskar of CPI(M) won the Bishnupur Paschim seat defeating Aruna Ghosh Dastidar of INC in 1996. In 1991 and 1987, Sundar Naskar of CPI(M) won the Bishnupur Purba seat defeating Ram Krishna Bar and Ardhendu Sekhar Naskar, both of INC, respectively, and Kashi Nath Adak of CPI(M) won the Bishnupur Paschim seat defeating Aruna Ghosh Dastidar and Shaik Moquebul Haque, both of INC, respectively. In 1982 and 1977, Sundar Naskar of CPI(M) won the Bishnupur Purba seat defeating Mahadeb Naskar and Ram Krishna Bar, both of INC, respectively, and Provash Chandra Roy of CPI(M) won the Bishnupur Paschim seat defeating Niranjan Ghosh and Moaue Haque Shaik, both of INC, respectively.

=== Legislative Assembly Elections 1952-1972 ===
From 1962 to 1972, Bishnupur Assembly constituency had two seats. In 1972 and 1971, Ram Krishna Bar of INC won the Bishnupur Purba seat and Provash Chandra Roy of CPI(M) won the Bishnupur Paschim seat. In 1969 and 1967, Sundar Kumar Naskar of CPI(M) won the Bishnupur Purba seat and Provash Chandra Roy of CPI(M) won the Bishnupur Paschim seat. In 1962, Santilata Mondal of INC won the Bishnupur Purba seat and Jugal Chandra Santra of INC won the Bishnupur Paschim seat. In 1957 and 1952, Bishnupur Assembly constituency had joint seats. In 1957, Provash Chandra Roy and Rabindranath Roy, both of CPI, won. In 1952, Basanta Kumar Mal of INC and Provash Chandra Roy of CPI, won.
