= Satgachhia Assembly constituency =

Constituency of the West Bengal Legislative Assembly, in India

Satgachhia
- Constituency No. 145 for the West Bengal Legislative Assembly
- Interactive Map Outlining Satgachhia Assembly Constituency

Constituency details
- Country: India
- Region: East India
- State: West Bengal
- District: South 24 Parganas
- Lok Sabha constituency: Diamond Harbour
- Established: 1977
- Total electors: 270,148
- Reservation: None

Member of Legislative Assembly
- 18th West Bengal Legislative Assembly
- Incumbent Agniswar Naskar
- Party: BJP
- Alliance: NDA
- Elected year: 2026

Satgachhia Assembly constituency is a Legislative Assembly constituency of South 24 Parganas district in the Indian State of West Bengal.

== Overview ==
As per order of the Delimitation Commission in respect of the Delimitation of constituencies in the West Bengal, Satgachhia Assembly constituency is composed of the following:

- Bishnupur II community development block
- Burul, Chakmanik, Gaja Poyali, Kamrabad, Naskarpur, Rania and Satgachhia gram panchayats of Budge Budge II community development block

Satgachhia Assembly constituency is a part of No. 21 Diamond Harbour Lok Sabha constituency.

== Members of the Legislative Assembly ==
Year	Member	Party
1977	Jyoti Basu	Communist Party of India (Marxist)
1982	Jyoti Basu	Communist Party of India (Marxist)
1987	Jyoti Basu	Communist Party of India (Marxist)
1991	Jyoti Basu	Communist Party of India (Marxist)
1996	Jyoti Basu	Communist Party of India (Marxist)
2001	Sonali Guha	Trinamool Congress
2006	Sonali Guha	Trinamool Congress
2011	Sonali Guha	Trinamool Congress
2016	Sonali Guha	Trinamool Congress
2021	Mohan Chandra Naskar	Trinamool Congress
2026	Agniswar Naskar	Bharatiya Janata Party

== Election results ==
Vote share of Winning candidates
2026	46.38%
2021	50.37%
2016	47.98%
2011	51.18%
2006	48.01%
2001	46.65%
1996	48.69%
1991	54.07%
1987	57.12%
1982	68.26%
1977	79.86%

=== 2026 ===
2026 West Bengal Legislative Assembly election: Satgachhia
Party	Candidate	Votes	%	±%
BJP	Agniswar Naskar	111,023	46.38	▲5.91
AITC	Somashree Betal	110,622	46.21	▼4.16
CPI(M)	Goutam Pal	11,736	4.9	▼1.99
NOTA	None of the above	1,654	0.69	▲0.11
Majority		401	0.17	▼9.73
Turnout		239,370	93.39	▲6.21
BJP gain from AITC		Swing		

=== 2021 ===
2021 West Bengal Legislative Assembly election: Satgachhia
Party	Candidate	Votes	%	±%
AITC	Mohan Chandra Naskar	118,635	50.37	▲2.39
BJP	Chandan Pal	95,317	40.47	▲31.44
CPI(M)	Goutam Pal	16,220	6.89	▼32.81
SUCI(C)	Sheikh Rabiyal	1,625	0.69	New
BSP	Sanjay Kumar Sah	1,379	0.59	▼0.17
NOTA	None of the Above	1,377	0.58	▼0.81
Majority		23,318	9.9	▲1.62
Turnout		235,546	87.18	▼1.44
AITC hold		Swing		

=== 2016 ===
2016 West Bengal Legislative Assembly election: Satgachhia
Party	Candidate	Votes	%	±%
AITC	Sonali Guha	100,171	47.98	▼3.2
CPI(M)	Paramita Ghosh	82,899	39.70	▼1.61
BJP	Saptarshi Basu	18,857	9.03	▲4.93
NOTA	None of the Above	2,902	1.39	
Majority		17,272	8.28	▼1.59
Turnout		1,88,183	88.62	▲2.98
AITC hold		Swing		

=== 2011 ===
2011 West Bengal Legislative Assembly election: Satgachia
Party	Candidate	Votes	%	±%
AITC	Sonali Guha (Bose)	93,902	51.18	
CPI(M)	Barun Naskar	75,792	41.31	
BJP	Subrata Samanta	7,517	4.10	
IND	Tirthankar Ghosh	1,930	1.05	
CPI(ML)L	Dilip Pal	1,658	0.90	
IND	Gofran Molla	1,619	0.88	
IND	Asit Baran Kumar	1,070	0.58	
Majority		18,110	9.87	
Turnout		183,488	85.34	
AITC hold		Swing		

=== 2006 ===
2006 West Bengal Legislative Assembly election: Satgachia
Party	Candidate	Votes	%	±%
AITC	Sonali Guha (Bose)	64,322	48.01	
CPI(M)	Kabita Kayal	57,526	42.94	
INC	Mujibar Rahaman Kayal	6,353	4.74	
IND	Tamradhwaj Adak	1,737	1.30	
IND	Sandip Kumar Mondal	1,536	1.15	
IND	Kabita Barua	931	0.69	
IND	Basir Ali Sekh	861	0.64	
IND	Debashis Banerjee	701	0.52	
Majority		6,796	5.07	
Turnout		133,967		
AITC hold		Swing		

=== 2001 ===
2001 West Bengal Legislative Assembly election: Satgachia
Party	Candidate	Votes	%	±%
AITC	Sonali Guha	56,325	46.65	
CPI(M)	Gokul Bairagi	50,314	41.68	
BJP	Sibaji Das Gupta	4,552	3.77	
NCP	Samsul Alam Saikh (Kalam)	4,513	3.74	
IND	Debashis Bandyopadhyay	1,861	1.54	
IND	Timir Baran Ghosh	1,639	1.36	
PDS	Anuradha Putatunda	1,525	1.26	
Majority		6,011	4.98	
Turnout		120,747	76.13	
Swing to AITC from CPI(M)		Swing		

=== 1996 ===
1996 West Bengal Legislative Assembly election: Satgachia
Party	Candidate	Votes	%	±%
CPI(M)	Jyoti Basu	58,597	48.69	
INC	Bag Chitta Ranjan	47,487	39.46	
BJP	Muzaffar Khan	10,686	8.88	
IND	Ghosh Timir Baran	1,862	1.55	
IUML	Abdul Ajij	816	0.68	
SS	Madan Mohan Das	410	0.34	
IND	Swapan Dey	245	0.20	
IND	Abhijit Ghosh	149	0.12	
IND	Shyamal Das	95	0.08	
Majority		11,110	9.23	
Turnout		123,451	83.92	
CPI(M) hold		Swing		

=== 1991 ===
1991 West Bengal Legislative Assembly election: Satgachia
Party	Candidate	Votes	%	±%
CPI(M)	Jyoti Basu	54,798	54.07	
INC	Amar Bhattacharya	34,603	34.14	
BJP	Bimal Maitra	8,598	8.48	
IND	Seikh Rabial	1,465	1.45	
IND	Mukunda Lal Paul	413	0.41	
IND	Hazi Saukat Ali	381	0.38	
JP	Shivaji Prasad Gupta	305	0.30	
BSP	Sritan Das	239	0.24	
IND	Sahajan Mallick	233	0.23	
IND	Indubhusan Roy	215	0.21	
IND	Santimoy Mukherjee	97	0.10	
Majority		20,195	19.93	
Turnout		103,677	78.94	
CPI(M) hold		Swing		

=== 1987 ===
1987 West Bengal Legislative Assembly election: Satgachia
Party	Candidate	Votes	%	±%
CPI(M)	Jyoti Basu	51,135	57.12	
INC	Sardar Amjad Ali	35,331	39.47	
IND	Rana Santosh	2,667	2.98	
IND	Anil Halder	269	0.30	
IND	Susil Maji	115	0.13	
Majority		15,804	17.65	
Turnout		91,099	81.76	
CPI(M) hold		Swing		

=== 1982 ===
1982 West Bengal Legislative Assembly election: Satgachia
Party	Candidate	Votes	%	±%
CPI(M)	Jyoti Basu	50,618	68.26	
INC	Dinabandhu Bairagi	23,532	31.74	
Majority		27,086	36.52	
Turnout		75,974	79.61	
CPI(M) hold		Swing		

=== 1977 ===
1977 West Bengal Legislative Assembly election: Satgachia
Party	Candidate	Votes	%	±%
CPI(M)	Jyoti Basu	45,538	79.86	
INC	Jumman Ali Mollah	7,092	12.44	
JP	Asok Kumar Ghosal	3,817	6.69	
IND	Dilip Das	459	0.80	
IND	Himangshu Roy	119	0.21	
Majority		38,446	67.42	
Turnout		57,778	63.58	
CPI(M) win (new seat)				
