= Diamond Harbour Lok Sabha constituency =

Lok Sabha constituency in West Bengal

Coordinates: 22°11′28″N 88°11′26″E

Diamond Harbour WB-21
- Lok Sabha constituency
- Interactive Map Outlining Diamond Harbour Lok Sabha Constituency

Constituency details
- Country: India
- Region: East India
- State: West Bengal
- Assembly constituencies: Diamond Harbour; Falta; Satgachhia; Bishnupur; Maheshtala; Budge Budge; Metiaburuz
- Established: 1952–Present
- Total electors: 1,712,612
- Reservation: None

Member of Parliament
- 18th Lok Sabha
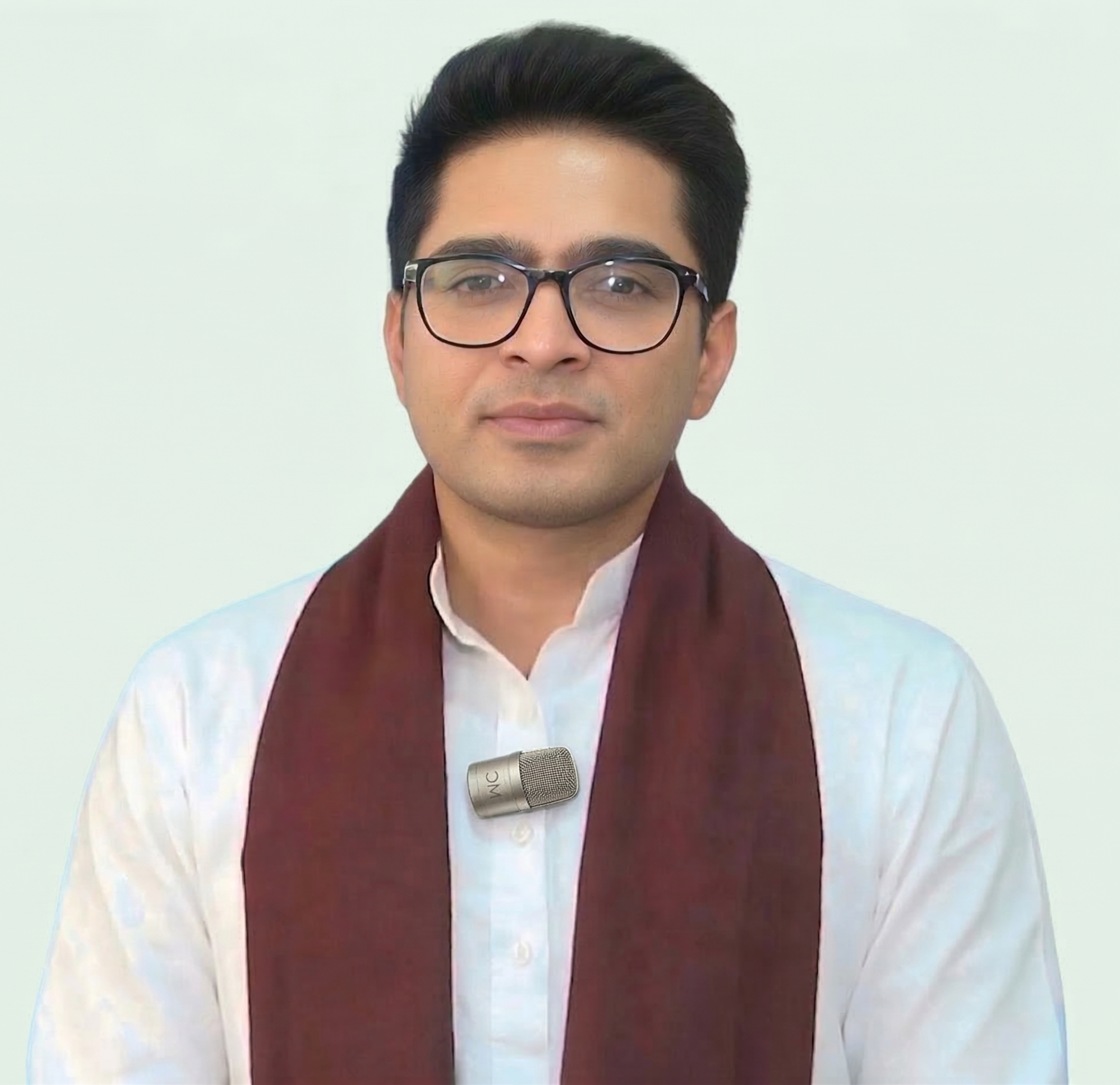
- Incumbent Abhishek Banerjee
- Party: MAITC
- Alliance: INDIA
- Elected year: 2024

Diamond Harbour Lok Sabha constituency is one of the 543 Parliamentary constituencies in India. The constituency centres on Diamond Harbour in West Bengal. All seven legislative assembly segments of No. 21 Diamond Harbour Lok Sabha constituency are in South 24 Parganas district.

== Assembly segments ==
Parliamentary constituencies in West Bengal - 1. Cooch Behar, 2. Alipurduars, 3. Jalpaiguri, 4. Darjeeling, 5. Raiganj, 6. Balurghat, 7. Maldaha Uttar, 8. Maldaha Dakshin, 9. Jangipur, 10. Baharampur, 11. Murshidabad, 12. Krishnanagar, 13. Ranaghat, 14. Bangaon, 15. Barrackpore, 16. Dum Dum, 17. Barasat, 18. Basirhat, 19. Jaynagar, 20. Mathurapur, 21. Diamond Harbour, 22. Jadavpur, 23. Kolkata Dakshin, 24. Kolkata Uttar, 25. Howrah, 26. Uluberia, 27. Serampore, 28. Hooghly, 29. Arambagh, 30. Tamluk, 31, Kanthi, 32. Ghatal, 33. Jhargram, 34. Medinipur, 35. Purulia, 36. Bankura, 37. Bishnupur, 38. Bardhaman Purba, 39. Bardhaman Durgapur, 40. Asansol, 41. Bolpur, 42. Birbhum

As per order of the Delimitation Commission in respect of the Delimitation of constituencies in the West Bengal, Diamond Harbour Lok Sabha constituency is composed of the following legislative assembly segments from 2009:

#	Name	District	Member	Party	2024 Lead
143	Diamond Harbour	South 24 Parganas	Pannalal Halder	AITC	AITC
144	Falta	South 24 Parganas	Debangshu Panda	BJP	AITC
145	Satgachhia	South 24 Parganas	Agniswar Naskar	BJP	AITC
146	Bishnupur (SC)	South 24 Parganas	Dilip Mondal	AITC	AITC
155	Maheshtala	South 24 Parganas	Subhasish Das	AITC	AITC
156	Budge Budge	South 24 Parganas	Ashok Kumar Deb	AITC	AITC
157	Metiaburuz	South 24 Parganas	Abdul Khaleque Molla	AITC	AITC

== Members of Parliament ==
Year	Member	Party
1952	Kamal Basu	Communist Party of India
1952	Purnendu Sekhar Naskar	Indian National Congress
1957	Purnendu Sekhar Naskar	Indian National Congress
1957	Kansari Halder	Communist Party of India
1962	Sudhansu Bhushan Das	Indian National Congress
1967	Jyotirmoy Basu	Communist Party of India (Marxist)
1971	Jyotirmoy Basu	Communist Party of India (Marxist)
1977	Jyotirmoy Basu	Communist Party of India (Marxist)
1980	Jyotirmoy Basu	Communist Party of India (Marxist)
1982^	Amal Datta	Communist Party of India (Marxist)
1984	Amal Datta	Communist Party of India (Marxist)
1989	Amal Datta	Communist Party of India (Marxist)
1991	Amal Datta	Communist Party of India (Marxist)
1996	Samik Lahiri	Communist Party of India (Marxist)
1998	Samik Lahiri	Communist Party of India (Marxist)
1999	Samik Lahiri	Communist Party of India (Marxist)
2004	Samik Lahiri	Communist Party of India (Marxist)
2009	Somen Mitra	Trinamool Congress
2014	Abhishek Banerjee	Trinamool Congress
2019	Abhishek Banerjee	Trinamool Congress
2024	Abhishek Banerjee	Trinamool Congress

^ by-poll

1. CPI (2 times) (9.52%)
2. CPI(M) (12 times) (57.1%)
3. INC (3 times) (14.3%)
4. TMC (4 times) (19.1%)

== Election results ==
Vote share of Winning candidates
2024	68.48%
2019	56.15%
2014	40.31%
2009	53.56%
2004	51.51%
1999	47.70%
1998	45.97%
1996	47.37%
1991	48.12%
1989	51.08%
1984	48.00%
1982	61.03%
1980	63.78%
1977	70.61%
1971	53.35%
1967	51.09%
1957	25.44%
1957	25.18%
1951	17.79%
1951	17.45%

=== 2024 ===
2024 Indian general election: Diamond Harbour
Party	Candidate	Votes	%	±%
AITC	Abhishek Banerjee	1,048,230	68.48	
BJP	Abhijit Das (Bobby)	337,300	22.03	
CPI(M)	Pratik Ur Rahaman	86,953	5.68	
AISF	Majnu Laskar	21,139	1.38	
NOTA	None of the Above	10,188	0.67	
Majority		710,930	46.45	
Turnout				
AITC hold		Swing		

=== 2019 ===
2019 Indian general elections: Diamond Harbour
Party	Candidate	Votes	%	±%
AITC	Abhishek Banerjee	791,127	56.15	+15.82
BJP	Nilanjan Roy	470,533	33.39	+17.46
CPI(M)	Dr. Fuad Halim	93,941	6.67	−28.00
INC	Soumya Aich Roy	19,828	1.41	−3.6
BSP	Md. Goribulla Molla	2,911	0.21	
SUCI(C)	Ajay Ghosh	1,846	0.13	
NOTA	None of the above	16,247	1.15	
Majority		320,594	22.76	
Turnout		1,409,373	81.98	
AITC hold		Swing		

=== 2014 ===
2014 Indian general election: Diamond Harbour
Party	Candidate	Votes	%	±%
AITC	Abhishek Banerjee	508,481	40.31	
CPI(M)	Dr. Abul Hasnat	437,183	34.66	
BJP	Abhijit Das (Bobby)	200,858	15.92	
INC	Md. Qamruzzaman Qamar	63,047	5.00	
Independent	6 Independent Candidates	27,939	2.23	
Others	6 Other Party Candidates	13,131	1.04	
NOTA	None of the Above	10,657	0.84	
Majority		71,298	5.65	
Turnout				
AITC hold		Swing		

=== 2009 ===
2009 Indian general election: Diamond Harbour
Party	Candidate	Votes	%	±%
AITC	Somendra Nath Mitra	564,612	53.56	
CPI(M)	Samik Lahiri	412,923	39.17	
BJP	Abhijit Das	37,542	3.56	
Independent	3 Independent Candidates	16,709	1.59	
Others	4 Other Party Candidates	22,326	2.11	
Majority		151,689	14.39	
Turnout				
Swing to AITC from CPI(M)		Swing		

=== 2004 ===
2004 Indian general election: Diamond Harbour
Party	Candidate	Votes	%	±%
CPI(M)	Samik Lahiri	430,890	51.51	
AITC	Saugata Roy	277,106	33.13	
INC	Daulat Ali Sheikh	92,859	11.10	
Independent	5 Independent Candidates	22,835	2.73	
Others	4 Other Party Candidates	12,850	1.54	
Majority		153,784	18.38	
Turnout				
CPI(M) hold		Swing		

=== 1999 ===
1999 Indian general election: Diamond Harbour
Party	Candidate	Votes	%	±%
CPI(M)	Samik Lahiri	402,761	47.70	
AITC	Sardar Amjad Ali	331,598	39.27	
INC	Sk Daulat Ali	106,344	12.59	
Independent	4 Independent Candidates	3,639	0.44	
Majority		71,163	8.43	
Turnout		858,209	75.49	
CPI(M) hold		Swing		

=== 1998 ===
1998 Indian general election: Diamond Harbour
Party	Candidate	Votes	%	±%
CPI(M)	Samik Lahiri	405,048	45.97	
AITC	Kakoli Ghosh Dastidar	344,092	39.05	
INC	Dr. Maya Ghose	124,335	14.11	
Independent	4 Independent Candidates	7,629	0.86	
Majority		60,956	6.92	
Turnout				
CPI(M) hold		Swing		

=== 1996 ===
1996 Indian general election: Diamond Harbour
Party	Candidate	Votes	%	±%
CPI(M)	Samik Lahiri	411,844	47.37	
INC	Amjad Ali Sardar	389,318	44.77	
BJP	Dulal Chaudhuri	55,518	6.38	
Independent	3 Independent Candidates	5,085	0.59	
Others	2 Other Party Candidates	7,746	0.89	
Majority		22,526	2.60	
Turnout		889,735	80.48	
CPI(M) hold		Swing		

=== 1991 ===
1991 Indian general election: Diamond Harbour
Party	Candidate	Votes	%	±%
CPI(M)	Amal Dutta	338,884	48.12	
INC	Maya Ghosh	293,372	41.66	
BJP	Muzaffar Khan	62,219	8.84	
Independent	2 Independent Candidates	4,409	0.63	
Others	2 Other Party Candidates	5,292	0.75	
Majority		45,512	6.46	
Turnout		720,436	74.90	
CPI(M) hold		Swing		

=== 1989 ===
1989 Indian general election: Diamond Harbour
Party	Candidate	Votes	%	±%
CPI(M)	Amal Datta	374,532	51.08	
INC	Maya Ghosh	331,487	45.21	
IUML	Khan Azizul Islam	21,984	3.00	
BSP	Dhanooram Jaiswara	3,394	0.46	
Independent	Md. Ibrahim Khan	1,330	0.18	
INC(O)	Shaikh Abdul Waduj	570	0.08	
Majority		43,045	5.87	
Turnout		746,043	79.34	
CPI(M) hold		Swing		

=== 1984 ===
1984 Indian general election: Diamond Harbour
Party	Candidate	Votes	%	±%
CPI(M)	Amal Datta	281,271	48.00	
INC	Sudhendu Mundle	276,598	47.20	
IUML	Mohd. Salahuddin	25,695	4.38	
Independent	Parsuram Show	2,465	0.42	
Majority		4,673	0.80	
Turnout		598,286	75.23	
CPI(M) hold		Swing		

=== 1982 ===
1982 by-election: Diamond Harbour
Party	Candidate	Votes	%	±%
CPI(M)	A. Datta	296,980	61.03	
INC	J. Abedin	180,757	37.15	
Independent	G. C. Mukherjee	4,755	0.98	
Independent	A. H. Mohammed	4,114	0.85	
Majority		116,223	23.88	
Turnout				
CPI(M) hold		Swing		

=== 1980 ===
1980 Indian general election: Diamond Harbour
Party	Candidate	Votes	%	±%
CPI(M)	Jyotirmoy Basu	310,406	63.78	
INC(I)	A. K. M. Ishaque	164,474	33.80	
IUML	Jamila Khatoon	7,214	1.48	
Independent	Paresh Pal	2,259	0.46	
Independent	Karuna Nadhan Roy	1,452	0.30	
Independent	Shaik Abdul Wadud	872	0.18	
Majority		145,932	29.98	
Turnout		496,366	70.88	
CPI(M) hold		Swing		

=== 1977 ===
1977 Indian general election: Diamond Harbour
Party	Candidate	Votes	%	±%
CPI(M)	Jyotirmoy Basu	267,890	70.61	
INC	Biren Mahanti	111,486	29.39	
Majority		156,404	41.22	
Turnout		389,100	63.95	
CPI(M) hold		Swing		

=== 1971 ===
1971 Indian general election: Diamond Harbour
Party	Candidate	Votes	%	±%
CPI(M)	Jyotirmoy Basu	204,987	53.35	
INC	Ambar Prosad Bandopadhaya	131,651	34.27	
Independent	Aziz Shaik	24,727	6.44	
AIFB	Alisup Rahaman	15,419	4.01	
INC(O)	Sudhansu Bhusan Das	7,413	1.93	
Majority		73,336	19.08	
Turnout		396,845	69.71	
CPI(M) hold		Swing		

=== 1967 ===
1967 Indian general election: Diamond Harbour
Party	Candidate	Votes	%	±%
CPI(M)	J. Basu	196,176	51.09	
INC	S. B. Das	125,202	32.61	
Independent	S. Roy	62,594	16.30	
Majority		70,974	18.48	
Turnout		394,853	74.30	
CPI(M) win (new seat)				

=== 1957 ===
1957 Indian general election: Diamond Harbour (Double-member constituency)
Party	Candidate	Votes	%	±%
CPI	Kansari Halder	247,785	25.44	
INC	Purnindu Sekhar Naskar	245,266	25.18	
CPI	Kamal Basu	244,763	25.13	
INC	Nalini Kanta Halder	236,192	24.25	
Independent	Sushil Kumar Sardar	0	0.00	
Majority		2,519	0.26	
Turnout		974,006	52.61	

=== 1951 ===
1951 Indian general election: Diamond Harbour (Double-member constituency)
Party	Candidate	Votes	%	±%
CPI	Basu Kamal	120,982	17.79	
INC	Naskar Purnendu Sekhar	118,671	17.45	
INC	Prosad Mahabir	98,677	14.51	
ABJS	Kayal Paresh Nath	94,208	13.85	
KMPP	Ghosh Sailendra Kumar	92,291	13.57	
ABJS	Koyal Bijoy Chandra	63,335	9.31	
Independent	Das Charu Chandra	27,282	4.01	
Independent	Mukherjee Jnanada Prosad	26,551	3.90	
Independent	Bhattacharjee Asutosh	24,666	3.63	
Independent	Pramanick Sudhindra Kumar	13,480	1.98	
Majority		2,311	0.34	
Turnout		680,143	46.58	

== See also ==
- Diamond Harbour
- List of constituencies of the Lok Sabha
