= Nimpith =

- Census Town
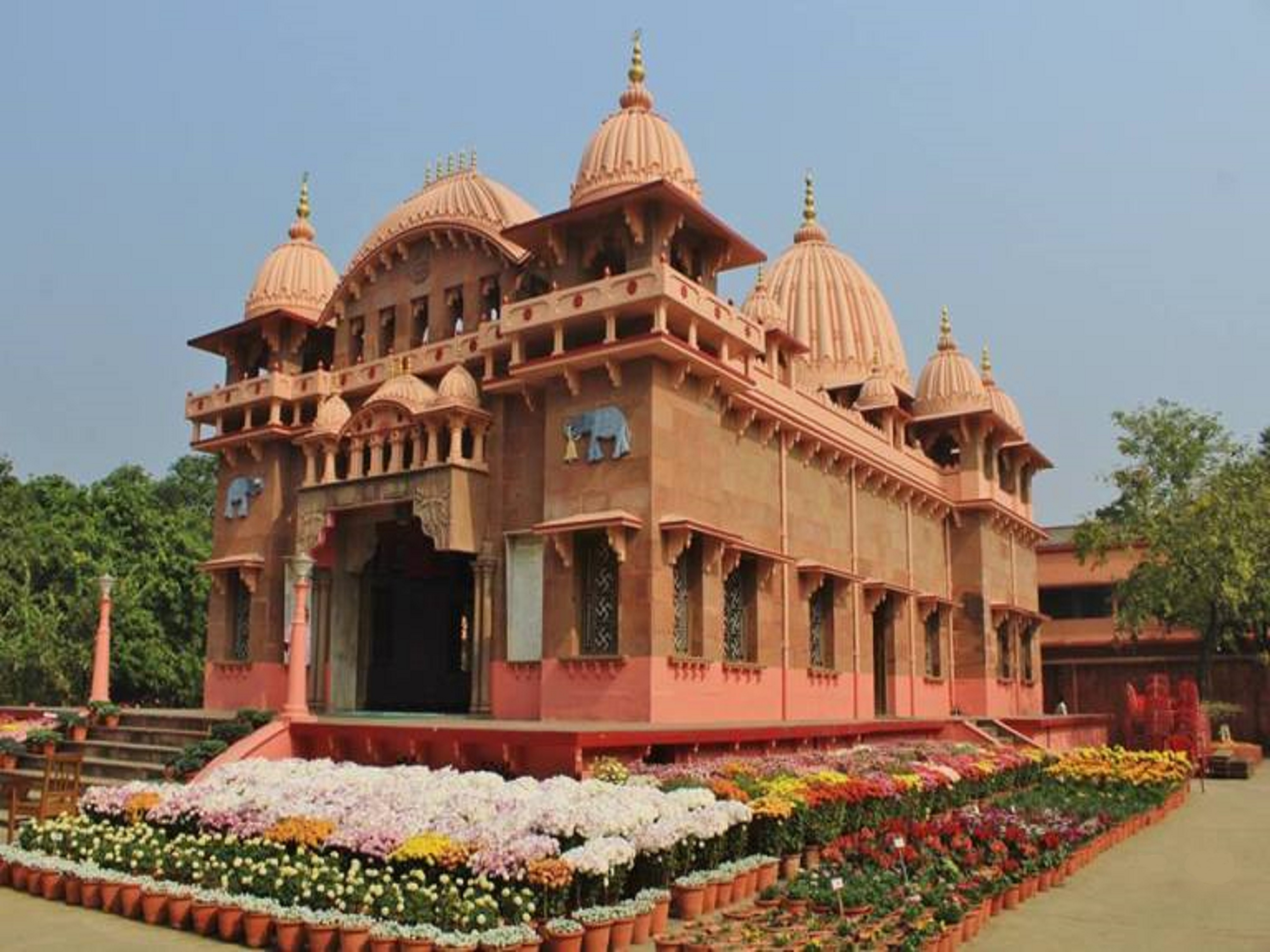
- Sri Ramkrishna Ashram
- Nickname: Pechor ghat
- Location in West Bengal Location in India
- Coordinates: 22.1572°N 88.4398°E
- Country: India
- State: West Bengal
- District: South 24 Parganas
- CD block: Jaynagar II
- Named for: Nimai ( Lord Mahaprabhu Nimai )

Area
  - Total: 2.02 km^{2} (0.78 sq mi)
  - Rank: Baruipur
- Elevation: 8 m (26 ft)

Population (2011)
  - Total: 8,014
  - Density: 3,970/km^{2} (10,300/sq mi)

Languages
  - Official: Bengali
  - Additional official: English
- Time zone: UTC+5:30 (IST)
- PIN: 743338
- Telephone code 226001: +91 03218
- Vehicle registration: WB-19 to WB-22, WB-95 to WB-99
- Lok Sabha constituency: Jaynagar (SC)
- Vidhan Sabha constituency: Jaynagar (SC)
- Website: www.s24pgs.gov.in

Nimpith is a census town within the jurisdiction of the Bakultala police station in the Jaynagar II CD block in the Baruipur subdivision of the South 24 Parganas district in the Indian state of West Bengal.

== Geography ==
Cities and towns in the southern part of Baruipur subdivision (including Baruipur, Jaynagar I & II, Kultali CD blocks) in South 24 Parganas district
M: municipal city/ town, CT: census town, R: rural/ urban centre, N: neighbourhood, H: historical place/ religious centre
Places linked with coastal activity are marked in blue
Owing to space constraints in the small map, the actual locations in a larger map may vary slightly

=== Area overview ===
Baruipur subdivision is a rural subdivision with moderate levels of urbanization. 31.05% of the population lives in the urban areas and 68.95% lives in the rural areas. In the southern portion of the subdivision (shown in the map alongside), there are 20 census towns. The entire district is situated in the Ganges Delta and the southern part is covered by the Baruipur-Jaynagar Plain. Archaeological excavations at Dhosa and Tilpi, on the bank of the Piyali River, indicate the existence of human habitation around 2,000 years ago.

Note: The map alongside presents some of the notable locations in the subdivision. All places marked in the map are linked in the larger full screen map.

=== Location ===
Nimpith is located at 22°09′26″N 88°26′23″E. It has an average elevation of 8 metres (26 ft).

Raynagar, Kalikapur Barasat, Baharu, Uttarparanij, Alipur and Uttar Durgapur, all in the Jaynagar I CD block, are adjacent to Jaynagar Majilpur. Nimpith and Tulshighata, both in the Jaynagar II CD block, are very close to Jaynagar Majilpur. These nine locations (eight census towns and a municipal city) virtually form a cluster.

=== Landmarks ===
There are landmarks that tourists from all over India and from foreign places come to visit. Some of these include Ramakrishna Ashram, Sarada Ashram, Indira Hall, the Vivekananda Institute of Biotechnology, and Krishi Vigyan Kendra.

== Demographics ==
According to the 2011 Census of India, Nimpith had a total population of 8,014, of which 4,069 (51%) were males and 3,945 (49%) were females. There were 723 persons in the age range of 0 to 6 years. The total number of literate persons in Nimpith was 5,843 (80.14% of the population over six years).

== Civic administration ==
=== CD block HQ ===
The headquarters of the Jaynagar II CD block are located at Nimpith. The map of the CD block Jaynagar II on the page number 725 in the District Census Handbook 2011 for the South 24 Parganas district shows the headquarters of the CD block as being located in Jaynagar Majilpur.

== Infrastructure ==
As per the District Census Handbook 2011, Nimpith covered an area of 2.018 km^{2}. Among the physical aspects, there is a railway station at Jaynagar Majilpur 4 km away. Among the civic amenities, the protected water supply involved overhead tank. It had 716 domestic electric connections. Among the medical facilities, was one medicine shop. Among the educational facilities it had were 15 primary schools, six middle schools, three secondary schools, and three senior secondary schools. The nearest general degree college at Dakshin Barasat 12 km away. Important commodities it produced were grills and pens.

== Agriculture ==
In 2010, the National Bank for Agriculture and Rural Development (NABARD) began its first pilot project in Nimpith, which focused upon practices for sustainable agriculture to promote lead crop productivity and technological adoption. NABARD stated that the project is intended to increase income for area farmers. The Vivekananda Institute of Biotechnology provided assistance for the project.

== Transport ==
Jaynagar-Jamtala Road links Nimpith to the State Highway 1.

Jaynagar Majilpur railway station is located nearby.

== Education ==
There are two very popular schools in Nimpith: Nimpith Ramakrishna Vidyabhavan and Nimpith Sarada Vidyamandir under the Sri Ramkrishna Ashrama, Nimpith. Students from all over West Bengal, and sometimes outsiders, attend these schools. Many students have achieved tremendously in various fields, both academic and non academic. Besides standard curriculums, some focus upon the study of the mind and body power as an enhancement to education and this is motivated by the concepts of Swami Vivekananda. There are other schools in the town besides these two.

Jaynagar Model School has been opened in Nimpith, under the initiative of the central government of India. It is the first co-educational English medium school in the area.

=== Science Laboratory ===
The Vivekananda Institute of Biotechnology is located in Nimpith. In 2007, the institute established the Vivekananda Center for Skills (VCS) in West Bengal at four locations. VCS works with farmers to help them develop skills and knowledge, improve upon productivity, and also provides training for the farmers. VCS also focuses upon helping unemployed people to build their careers, create enterprises and find employment.

== Healthcare ==
Sri Ramakrishna Rural Hospital, with 30 beds, at Nimpith, is the major government medical facility in the Jaynagar II CD block.

== Sports ==
Nimpith has a football ground named Vivekananda Play Ground.
