= Raynagar =

- Census Town
- Location in West Bengal Location in India
- Coordinates: 22.2237°N 88.4561°E
- Country: India
- State: West Bengal
- District: South 24 Parganas
- CD block: Jaynagar I

Area
  - Total: 0.98 km^{2} (0.38 sq mi)
- Elevation: 8 m (26 ft)

Population (2011)
  - Total: 5,593
  - Density: 5,700/km^{2} (15,000/sq mi)

Languages
  - Official: Bengali
  - Additional official: English
- Time zone: UTC+5:30 (IST)
- PIN: 743372
- Telephone code: +91 3218
- Vehicle registration: WB-19 to WB-22, WB-95 to WB-99
- Lok Sabha constituency: Jaynagar (SC)
- Vidhan Sabha constituency: Jaynagar (SC)
- Website: www.s24pgs.gov.in

Raynagar is a census town within the jurisdiction of the Jaynagar Majilpur police station in the Jaynagar I CD block in the Baruipur subdivision of the South 24 Parganas district in the Indian state of West Bengal.

== Geography ==
Cities and towns in Jaynagar I & II CD blocks in South 24 Parganas district
M: municipal city/ town, CT: census town, R: rural/ urban centre, H: historical place/ religious centre
Owing to space constraints in the small map, the actual locations in a larger map may vary slightly

=== Area overview ===
Baruipur subdivision is a rural subdivision with moderate levels of urbanization. 31.05% of the population lives in the urban areas and 68.95% lives in the rural areas. In the southern portion of the subdivision (shown in the map alongside) there are 20 census towns. The entire district is situated in the Ganges Delta and the southern part is covered by the Baruipur-Jaynagar Plain. Archaeological excavations at Dhosa and Tilpi, on the bank of the Piyali River, indicate the existence of human habitation around 2,000 years ago.

Note: The map alongside presents some of the notable locations in the subdivision. All places marked in the map are linked in the larger full screen map.

=== Location ===
Raynagar is located at 22°13′25″N 88°27′22″E. It has an average elevation of 8 metres (26 ft).

Raynagar, Kalikapur Barasat, Baharu, Uttarparanij, Alipur and Uttar Durgapur, all in the Jaynagar I CD block, are adjacent to Jaynagar Majilpur. Nimpith and Tulshighata, both in the Jaynagar II CD block, are very close to Jaynagar Majilpur. These nine locations (eight census towns and a municipal city) virtually form a cluster.

== Demographics ==
According to the 2011 Census of India, Raynagar had a total population of 5,593, of which 2,811 (50%) were males and 2,782 (50%) were females. There were 741 persons in the age range of 0–6 years. The total number of literate persons in Raynagar was 3,512 (72.38% of the population over 6 years).

== Infrastructure ==
According to the District Census Handbook 2011, Raynagar covered an area of 0.9825 km^{2}. Among the physical aspects, there is a railway station at Dakshin Barasat 0.5 km away. Among the civic amenities, it had 4 km roads with open drains, the protected water supply involved tank, pond, lake, overhead tank. It had 600 domestic electric connections, 20 road light points. Among the medical facilities it had 2 maternity and child welfare centres, 6 nursing homes. Among the educational facilities it had were 2 primary schools, the nearest middle school, secondary school, senior secondary school at Paschim Gabberia 0.5 km away. It had a non-formal education centre (Sarbya Siksha Abhijan). Among the social, recreational and cultural facilities, it had a public library in the town and a working women's hostel, a cinema theatre and a reading room at Dakshin Barasat 0.5 km away. Among important commodities it produced were dry flower craft and leather bags.

== Transport ==
A short stretch of local roads links Raynagar to the State Highway 1.

Dakshin Barasat railway station is located nearby.

== Education ==
Dhruba Chand Halder College, established in 1965, is affiliated with the University of Calcutta. It is located near Dakshin Barasat railway station. It offers honours courses in Bengali, English, Sanskrit, history, political science, philosophy, education, physics, chemistry, mathematics, zoology, botany, microbiology, economics, geography and accounting & finance, and general courses in arts, science and commerce.

== Healthcare ==
Padmerhat Rural Hospital, with 30 beds, at Padmerhat, is the major government medical facility in the Jaynagar I CD block.
