= Baharu =

- Census Town
- Location in West Bengal Location in India
- Coordinates: 22.2040°N 88.4283°E
- Country: India
- State: West Bengal
- District: South 24 Parganas
- CD block: Jaynagar I

Area
  - Total: 4.71 km^{2} (1.82 sq mi)
- Elevation: 8 m (26 ft)

Population (2011)
  - Total: 16,155
  - Density: 3,430/km^{2} (8,880/sq mi)

Languages
  - Official: Bengali
  - Additional official: English
- Time zone: UTC+5:30 (IST)
- PIN: 743372
- Telephone code: +91 3218
- Vehicle registration: WB-19 to WB-22, WB-95 to WB-99
- Lok Sabha constituency: Jaynagar (SC)
- Vidhan Sabha constituency: Jaynagar (SC)
- Website: www.s24pgs.gov.in

Baharu is a census town and a gram panchayat in the Jaynagar I CD block in the Baruipur subdivision of the South 24 Parganas district in the Indian state of West Bengal.

== History ==
Many janapadas grew up along the old Bhagirathi channel from the ancient times till around the 16th century: Kalighat, Boral, Rajpur, Harinavi, Mahinagar, Baruipur, Baharu, Jaynagar Majilpur, Majilpur, Chhatrabhog etc. Bipradas Pipilai's Manasavijaya, composed in 1495, mentions many places in this region. "Chand Sadagar, a merchant character of the Manasavijaya, reached Baruipur, from Kalighat, through the old Bhagirathi channel. From there he proceeded towards Chhatrabhog, and then traveling through Hatiagarh pargana reached the open sea". Chaitanyadeva (1486–1534) also went through this route. Travelling by boat to Puri he halted at the village of Atisara, near Baruipur. "His last stoppage in 24 Parganas was at Chhatrabhog, now a village within the jurisdiction of the Mathurapur police station. Chhatrabhog seems to have been an important river-port on the old Bhagirathi channel". Rama Chandra Khan, the zamindar of Chhatrabhog, helped Chaitanyadeva to continue with his journey.

== Geography ==
Cities and towns in the southern part of Baruipur subdivision (including Baruipur, Jaynagar I & II, Kultali CD blocks) in South 24 Parganas district
M: municipal city/ town, CT: census town, R: rural/ urban centre, N: neighbourhood, H: historical place/ religious centre
Places linked with coastal activity are marked in blue
Owing to space constraints in the small map, the actual locations in a larger map may vary slightly

=== Area overview ===
Baruipur subdivision is a rural subdivision with moderate levels of urbanization. 31.05% of the population lives in the urban areas and 68.95% lives in the rural areas. In the southern portion of the subdivision (shown in the map alongside) there are 20 census towns. The entire district is situated in the Ganges Delta and the southern part is covered by the Baruipur-Jaynagar Plain. Archaeological excavations at Dhosa and Tilpi, on the bank of the Piyali River indicate the existence of human habitation around 2,000 years ago.

Note: The map alongside presents some of the notable locations in the subdivision. All places marked in the map are linked in the larger full screen map.

=== Location ===
Baharu is located at 22°12′14″N 88°25′42″E. It has an average elevation of 8 metres (26 ft).

Raynagar, Kalikapur Barasat, Baharu, Uttarparanij, Alipur and Uttar Durgapur, all in the Jaynagar I CD block, are adjacent to Jaynagar Majilpur. Nimpith and Tulshighata, both in the Jaynagar II CD block, are very close to Jaynagar Majilpur. These nine locations (eight census towns and a municipal city) virtually form a cluster.

== Demographics ==
According to the 2011 Census of India, Baharu had a total population of 16,155, of which 8,319 (51%) were males and 7,836 (49%) were females. There were 1,968 persons in the age range of 0 to 6 years. The total number of literate persons in Baharu was 11,152 (78.61% of the population over 6 years).

== Civic administration ==
=== CD block HQ ===
The headquarters of the Jaynagar I CD block are located at Baharu. The map of the CD block Jaynagar I on the page number 699 in the District Census Handbook 2011 for the South 24 Parganas district shows the headquarters of the CD block as being located in Jaynagar Majilpur.

== Infrastructure ==
According to the District Census Handbook 2011, Baharu covered an area of 4.7097 km^{2}. Among the physical aspects, Baharu railway station is in the town. Among the civic amenities, it had 4 km roads with open drains, the protected water supply involved tank, pond, lake, overhead tank. It had 1,420 domestic electric connections, 20 road light points. Among the medical facilities it had 1 medicine shop. Among the educational facilities it had were 9 primary schools, 2 middle schools, 2 secondary schools, 2 senior secondary schools. Among the social, recreational and cultural facilities, it had 1 public library and 1 reading room. An old age home and a community centre / auditorium at Dakshin Barasat 2 km away. Among the important commodities it produced were dry flower craft and leather bags.

== Transport ==
Baharu is on the State Highway 1.

Baharu railway station is on the Sealdah–Namkhana line of the Kolkata Suburban Railway system.

=== Commuters ===
With the electrification of the railways, suburban traffic has grown tremendously since the 1960s. As of 2005-06, more than 1.7 million (17 lakhs) commuters use the Kolkata Suburban Railway system daily. After the partition of India, refugees from erstwhile East Pakistan and Bangladesh had a strong impact on the development of urban areas in the periphery of Kolkata. The new immigrants depended on Kolkata for their livelihood, thus increasing the number of commuters. Eastern Railway runs 1,272 EMU trains daily.

== Education ==
Baharu High School is a Bengali-medium coeducational higher secondary school established in 1856.

Baharu Girls’ High School is a higher secondary school.

== Healthcare ==
Padmerhat Rural Hospital, with 30 beds, at Padmerhat, is the major government medical facility in the Jaynagar I CD block.
