= Kalikapur Barasat =

- Census Town
- Location in West Bengal Location in India
- Coordinates: 22.2206°N 88.4464°E
- Country: India
- State: West Bengal
- District: South 24 Parganas
- CD block: Jaynagar I

Area
  - Total: 1.40 km^{2} (0.54 sq mi)
- Elevation: 8 m (26 ft)

Population (2011)
  - Total: 6,104
  - Density: 4,360/km^{2} (11,300/sq mi)

Languages
  - Official: Bengali
  - Additional official: English
- Time zone: UTC+5:30 (IST)
- PIN: 743372
- Telephone code: +91 3218
- Vehicle registration: WB-19 to WB-22, WB-95 to WB-99
- Lok Sabha constituency: Jaynagar (SC)
- Vidhan Sabha constituency: Jaynagar (SC)
- Website: www.s24pgs.gov.in

Kalikapur Barasat is a census town within the jurisdiction of the Jaynagar Majilpur police station in the Jaynagar I CD block in the Baruipur subdivision of the South 24 Parganas district in the Indian state of West Bengal.

== Geography ==
Cities and towns in the southern part of Baruipur subdivision (including Baruipur, Jaynagar I & II, Kultali CD blocks) in South 24 Parganas district
M: municipal city/ town, CT: census town, R: rural/ urban centre, N: neighbourhood, H: historical place/ religious centre
Places linked with coastal activity are marked in blue
Owing to space constraints in the small map, the actual locations in a larger map may vary slightly

=== Area overview ===
Baruipur subdivision is a rural subdivision with moderate levels of urbanization. 31.05% of the population lives in the urban areas and 68.95% lives in the rural areas. In the southern portion of the subdivision (shown in the map alongside) there are 20 census towns. The entire district is situated in the Ganges Delta and the southern part is covered by the Baruipur-Jaynagar Plain. Archaeological excavations at Dhosa and Tilpi, on the bank of the Piyali River indicate the existence of human habitation around 2,000 years ago.

Note: The map alongside presents some of the notable locations in the subdivision. All places marked in the map are linked in the larger full screen map.

=== Location ===
Kalikapur Barasat is located at 22°13′14″N 88°26′47″E. It has an average elevation of 8 metres (26 ft).

Raynagar, Kalikapur Barasat, Baharu, Uttarparanij, Alipur and Uttar Durgapur, all in the Jaynagar I CD block, are adjacent to Jaynagar Majilpur. Nimpith and Tulshighata, both in the Jaynagar II CD block, are very close to Jaynagar Majilpur. These nine locations (eight census towns and a municipal city) virtually form a cluster.

== Demographics ==
According to the 2011 Census of India, Kalikapur Barasat had a total population of 6,104, of which 3,103 (51%) were males and 3,001 (49%) were females. There were 502 persons in the age range of 0–6 years. The total number of literate persons in Kalikapur Barasat was 4,999 (89.24% of the population above 6 years).

== Infrastructure ==
According to the District Census Handbook 2011, Kalikapur Barasat covered an area of 1.3994 km^{2}. Among the physical aspects, there is a railway station at Dakshin Barasat 0.5 km away. Among the civic amenities, it had 5 km roads with open drains, the protected water supply involved tank, pond, lake, hand pumps. It had 593 domestic electric connections, 18 road light points. Among the medical facilities it had 1 family welfare centre in the town and a nursing home 0.5 km away. Among the educational facilities it had was 1 primary school, the nearest middle school, secondary school, senior secondary school at Barasat 0.5 km away. It had the branch of 1 nationalised bank.

== Transport ==
Kalikapur Barasat is on the State Highway 1.

Dakshin Barasat railway station is located nearby.

== Healthcare ==
Padmerhat Rural Hospital, with 30 beds, at Padmerhat, is the major government medical facility in the Jaynagar I CD block.
