= Tilpi Dhosa =

Archaeological site in West Bengal, India

- তিলপী-ধোসা (Bengali)
- Location within West Bengal
- 22.2473926°N 88.5270593°E
- Type: Settlement
- Location: Tilpi and Dhosa, West Bengal, India

History
- Built: 2nd century BCE

Site notes
- Condition: Ruins
- Public access: Yes

Tilpi-Dhosa is an archaeological site of Indian state of West Bengal. The archaeological site is situated on the right bank of Piyali River, which spans both Tilpi and Dhosa villages. Exploration and limited archaeological excavations in both these villages have uncovered 2,200-year-old artefacts and Gupta-era Buddhist stupa.

Excavations have been conducted at various times at the site. Artifacts found during the excavations prove the antiquity and archaeological importance of Tilpi-Dhosa. Major part of the artifacts are preserved in the State Archaeological Museum of West Bengal. Chinese Buddhist monk Fa-Hien mentioned visiting a large mound in the vicinity of Tilpi-Dhosa, which roughly corresponds to the location of the village of Dhosa; a large number of terracotta bricks have been found here, which is evidence of the presence of a large well-built structure.

== Archaeology ==
Residents of Tilpi and Dhosa villages have recovered ancient terracotta bricks and idols at different times, so they are aware of the ancient settlement. However, there are no mounds in the two villages, which are mostly formed from the ruins of ancient settlements. Survey exploration and excavation by the Archeology Department of the Government of West Bengal in two villages yielded evidence of ancient settlements. Excavations were carried out between 2005 AD and 2007 AD, which extending the human settlement at both villages to 200 BC. According to archaeologists, this place was connected by waterway to Chandraketugarh through Piyali and Bidyadhari rivers.

Archaeologists claim that the first cultural phase of the site spanned from the 2nd to the 1st century BC. However, most of the Gupta period artefacts have been found from the site. No urban features or presence of forts were found in the two villages, which indicating a rural and agricultural settlement at the site. According to artefacts from the village of Tilpi, the fire occurred in the 3rd century AD, and the village is no longer inhabited, but it was re-inhabited in the 16th–17th centuries. An ancient building-structure has been identified in the village of Dhosa, which archaeologists have referred to as a Buddhist stupa and identified as the Buddhist stupa mentioned in Fa-hien's description.

== Bibliography ==
- Jha, D.N. (2014). "Interpreting Historical Archaeology of Coastal Bengal: Possibilities and Limitations". The complex heritage of early India: essays in memory of R.S. Sharma. New Delhi: Manohar. ISBN 9789350980583.
- Chakraborty, Sharmi, ed. (2017). "Pratna Samiksha New Series Volume 8". Pratna Samiksha. 8. Archaeological Survey of India. ISSN 2229-7979.
