= Sri Ramkrishna Ashrama, Nimpith =

Indian non-governmental organization

Sri Ramkrishna Ashrama
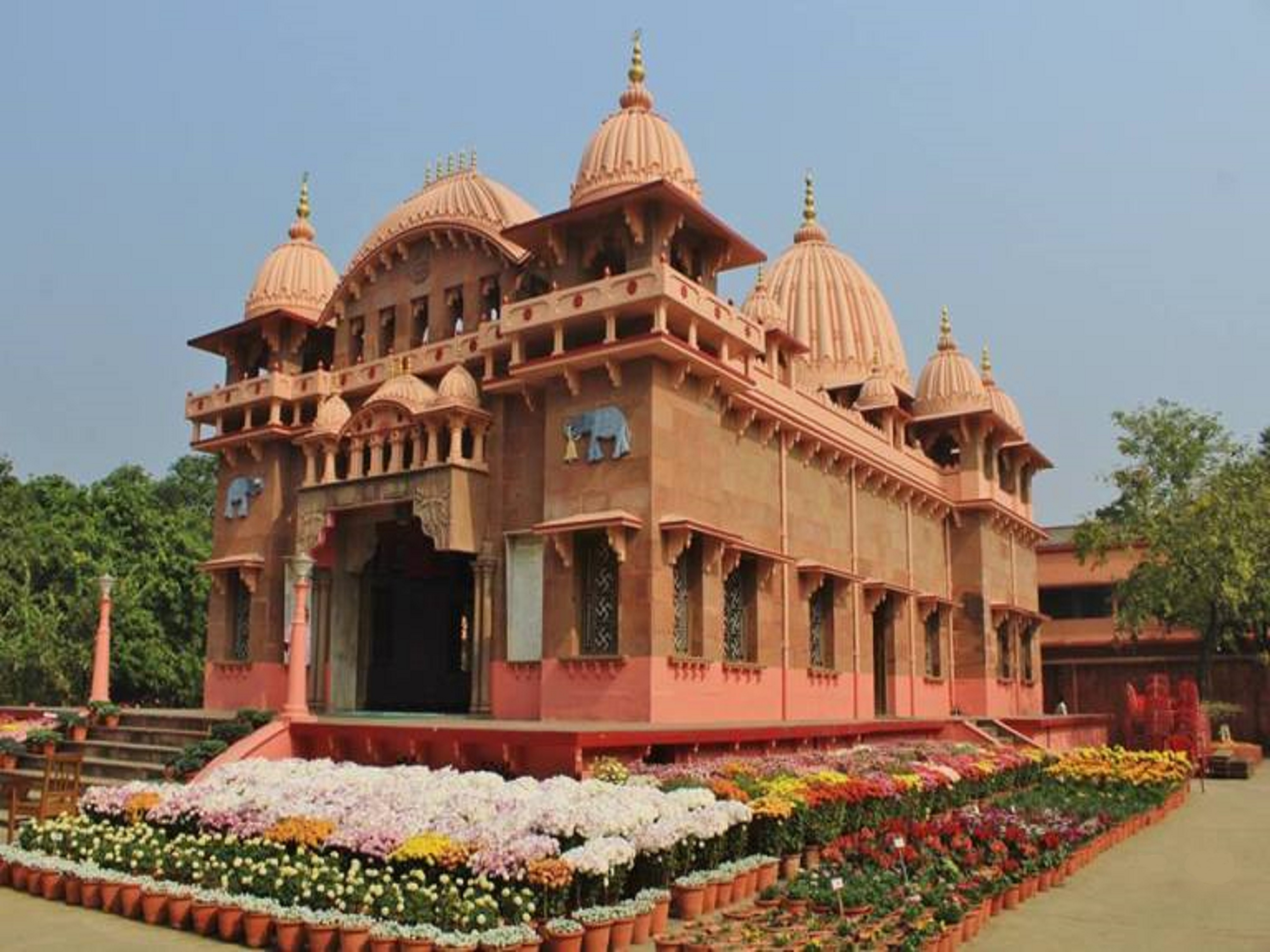
- Formation: 1960; 66 years ago
- Location: Nimpith, Jaynagar Majilpur, South 24 Parganas, West Bengal, India
- Coordinates: 22.157097°N 88.440246°E
- Website: www.nimpithrkashram.org

Sri Ramkrishna Ashrama is a Non-Governmental Organization, started by Swami Buddhanandaji in 1960. Though the Ashram is not a Branch of the Ramakrishna Math and Ramakrishna Mission, Belur Math, but it follows the same ideals and ideologies. It is a member centre of South 24 Paraganas Ramakrishna Vivekananda Bhava Prachar Parishad of Belur Math, and follows their guidelines. The Ashrama is situated at Nimpith in Jaynagar Majilpur of South 24 Parganas district in the Indian state of West Bengal. The Ashrama has 3 branch centres at Kaikhali, Jhargram and Bardhaman.

== History ==
In 1960, Swami Buddhanandaji Maharaj, a monk of the Ramakrishna Mission, set up this Ashram in Nimpith of Jaynagar Majilpur to serve the remote areas of South 24 Parganas district. It was constructed with the co-operation from the then Hon’ble Chief Minister of West Bengal, Dr. Bidhan Chandra Roy. People in Sundarbans had been suffered from poverty, illiteracy, superstitions and unemployment. The Ashram work rural developments to tackle people’s problems, established schools, island service centre, health centre and plan to bring in gradual self-reliance through agricultural research etc. Ramakrishna Vidyabhavan and Nimpith Sarada Vidyamandir are running under the Ashrama in Nimpith.

== Ramakrishna Ashram Krishi Vigyan Kendra ==
To work for the downtrodden people of Nimpith and surrounding villages, Swami Buddhananda started the Ramakrishna Ashram Krishi Vigyan Kendra, through the help of Indian Council of Agricultural Research (ICAR), New Delhi, in the year 1979.

The Ramakrishna Ashram Krishi Vigyan Kendra organized digital payment awareness camp for the farmers on 12 January 2017, National Youth Day (India).
