= Majilpur Shyamsundar Balika Vidyalaya =

School in West Bengal, India

Location
- Jaynagar Majilpur, South 24 Parganas, West Bengal, 743337; India
- Coordinates: 22.1683976°N 88.4217403°E

Information
- Type: Government-aided integrated school
- Established: 1934; 92 years ago
- School board: Department of School Education
- Authority: Government of West Bengal
- Category: Higher secondary
- Grades: V to XII
- Gender: Female
- Language: Bengali
- Campus type: Urban
- Colors: White; Dark Blue
- Affiliation: WBBSE; WBCHSE

Majilpur Shyamsundar Balika Vidyalaya (abbreviated as MSBV) is a government-sponsored high school in the Jaynagar Majilpur of the South 24 Parganas district in the Indian state of West Bengal. This is a girls' only school for the secondary and higher secondary level students. Its medium of instruction is Bengali.

== Geography ==
Majilpur Shyamsundar Balika Vidyalaya is located at 22°10′06″N 88°25′18″E. It has an average elevation of 8 metres (26 ft).

== History ==
Majilpur Shyamsundar Balika Vidyalaya was established in 1934; 92 years ago. It is one of the oldest schools in the whole country.

== Affiliations ==
The school is affiliated to the West Bengal Board of Secondary Education for secondary level students, and to the West Bengal Council of Higher Secondary Education for higher secondary level students.

== See also ==
- List of schools in West Bengal
