= Jaynagar Majilpur Municipality =

Municipal Corporation in West Bengal, India

- Seal of the Jaynagar Majilpur Municipality

Type
- Type: Municipality

History
- Founded: 1 April 1869; 157 years ago

Leadership
- Chairman: Sukumar Halder, AITC since 2022
- Vice Chairman: Rathin Kumar Mondal, AITC since 2022

Structure
- Seats: 14
- Political groups: Government (12): AITC (12); Opposition (1): INC (1); Other (1): IND (1)

Elections
- Last election: 2022
- Next election: 2027

Meeting place
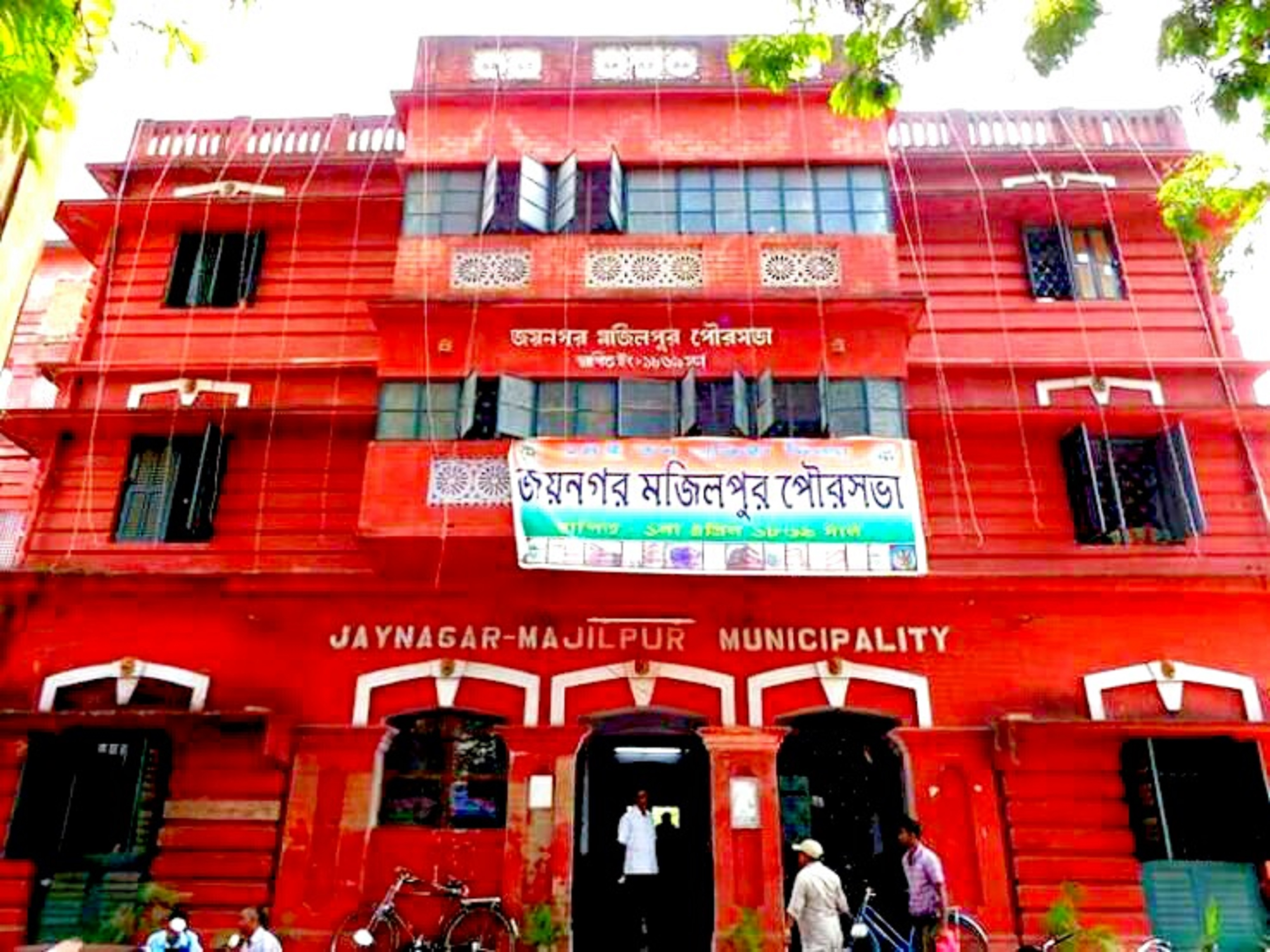
- Headquarters of the Jaynagar Majilpur Municipality

Website
- joynagarmozilpurmunicipality.com

Jaynagar Majilpur Municipality (abbreviated as JMM) is an urban local body of the South 24 Parganas district in the Indian state of West Bengal. It is responsible for the civic infrastructure and administration of the city of Jaynagar Majilpur. This civic administrative body administers an area of 5.85 km^{2} (2.26 sq mi). It is divided into 14 administrative wards.

== Geography ==
Jaynagar Majilpur Municipality is on the State Highway 1. It is located at 22°10′30″N 88°25′12″E and has an average elevation of 8 metres (26 ft).

== History ==
As per the Town Development Act 1850, Jaynagar Town Committee was established. It was responsible for the statutory planning and development of greater Jaynagar. According to the Bengal Municipal Improvement Act 1864, the town committee was awarded to municipality status and the name was finally set to Jaynagar Majilpur Municipality on 1 April 1869. It is one of the oldest municipalities in India. Harananda Vidyasagar, the father of the famous philosopher Sivanath Sastri, was the first chairman of this municipality.

Chairman	Vice Chairman
Harananda Vidyasagar (1869–1882); Haridas Dutta (1882–1886); Ananda Chandra Ghosh (1886–1900); Jogindra Nath Mitra (1900–1902); Biraj Krishna Dutta (1902–1903); Binoy Krishna Dutta (1903–1904); Bipin Bihari Dey (1904–1916); Khetra Nath Mitra (1916–1919); Nakuleshwar Basu (1919–1924); Surendra Nath Mitra (1924–1929); Bhutnath Chakraborty (1929–1935); Rampada Chatterjee (1935–1936); Paramananda Dutta (1936–1939); Sudhir Krishna Dutta (1939–1958); Birendra Nath Bhattacharya (1958–1959); Hirendra Nath Mitra (1959–1964); Sudhir Krishna Dutta (1964–1966); Prasun Kumar Ghosh (1966–1968); Monoranjan Dutta (1968–1981); Prashanta Sarkhel (1981–2002); Jalal Uddin Khan (2002–2005); Prashanta Sarkhel (2005–2010); Farida Begum Shaikh (2010–2015); Sujit Sarkhel (2015–2022); Sukumar Halder (2022–Present)	Shibaprasanna Chatterjee (1887–1888); Kalinath Dutta (1888–1898); Binoy Krishna Dutta (1898–1900); Shibaprasanna Chatterjee (1900–1904); Ramdas Banerjee (1904–1906); Binoy Krishna Dutta (1906–1908); Khetra Nath Mitra (1908–1915); Priyanath Mitra (1915–1917); Sahayaram Ghosh (1917–1919); Ramtaran Chatterjee (1919–1924); Moulabi Anayat Rashul (1924–1929); Binoy Krishna Bhattacharya (1929–1935); Debprasad Dutta (1935–1936); Sushil Gopal Dutta (1936–1939); Fani Bhusan Dey (1939–1942); Jnanendra Nath Mitra (1942–1944); Manindra Nath Basu (1944–1949); Prafulla Kumar Mitra (1949–1953); Manindra Nath Basu (1953–1956); Hirendra Nath Mitra (1956–1968); Kanailal Pal (1968–1981); Asit Brahmachari (1981–1986); Ismail Khan (1986–1990); Sukumar Mitra (1990–1995); Nanigopal Mondal (1995–2000); Jalal Uddin Khan (2000–2002); Bholanath Sinha (2002–2005); Mihir Ganguly (2005–2010); Prabir Baidya (2010–2015); Tushar Kanti Roy (2015–2022); Rathin Kumar Mondal (2022–Present)

== Structure ==
The municipality refers to the Board of Councillors, with one Councillor being elected from each of the 14 administrative wards of Jaynagar Majilpur city. The Board of Councillors elects a chairman from among its elected members.

According to the West Bengal Municipal Act 1993, Jaynagar Majilpur Municipality is run by the Chairman-in-Council system of governance and consists of the chairman, Vice Chairman and chief executive officer. The Chairman is the executive head of the municipality and the municipal administration is under his control. The Chairman nominates the Chairman-in-Council and distributes the various functions of the municipality. The Chairman presides over the meetings of the Chairman-in-Council as well as the Board of Councillors and in his absence the Vice Chairman chairs the meetings. The administrative functions of the municipalities are dealt through the committees and are headed by the Chairman-in-Council.

== Election ==
According to the 2022 municipal election, Jaynagar Majilpur Municipality is currently under the control of the All India Trinamool Congress. In that municipal election, the All India Trinamool Congress won in 12 wards out of the total 14 wards of Jaynagar Majilpur Municipality. Besides, Indian National Congress and Socialist Unity Centre of India (Communist) won in the other 2 wards.

12	1	1
AITC	INC	SUCI(C)

Ward Number	Councillor	Political Party
1	Farida Begum Shaikh	All India Trinamool Congress
2	Rakhi Bhattacharya	All India Trinamool Congress
3	Rathin Kumar Mondal	All India Trinamool Congress
4	Indira Das	All India Trinamool Congress
5	Prabir Kumar Roy	All India Trinamool Congress
6	Abul Kahar Molla	All India Trinamool Congress
7	Chinmay De	All India Trinamool Congress
8	Modhumita Pal	Indian National Congress
9	Labanya Prava Halder	All India Trinamool Congress
10	Sukumar Halder	All India Trinamool Congress
11	Naba Gopal Ganguly	All India Trinamool Congress
12	Bijali Mondal	All India Trinamool Congress
13	Prashanta Bhandari	All India Trinamool Congress
14	Panchu Gopal Mistri	Socialist Unity Centre of India (Communist)

== Department ==
Sl. No.	Department
1	Advertisement
2	Amusement
3	Assessment & Collection
4	Building
5	Bustee Services
6	Car Parking
7	Central Records
8	Ch. VS Department
9	Education
10	Election Office
11	Electricity
12	Engineering (Civil)
13	Estate
14	Finance & Accounts
15	Health
16	Info. & Public Relations
17	Information Technology
18	Institute of Urban Management
19	Internal Audit
20	Law
21	License
22	Lighting
23	Market
24	Municipal Secretary's Department
25	Municipal Service Commission
26	Parks & Squares
27	Personnel
28	Planning & Development
29	Printing
30	Environment & Heritage Department
31	Roads & Asphaltum
32	Sewerage & Drainage
33	Social Welfare & Urban Poverty Alleviation Department
34	Solid Waste Management
35	Supply
36	City Planning Department
37	Treasury Department
38	Vigilance
39	Water Supply

== Service ==
The Jaynagar Majilpur Municipality is responsible for administering and providing basic infrastructure to the city.

- Water purification and supply
- Sewage treatment and disposal
- Garbage disposal and street cleanliness
- Food Inspection: Through JMM Food Inspectors
- Solid waste management
- Building and maintenance of roads, streets and flyovers
- Street lighting
- Maintenance of parks and open spaces
- Cemeteries and Crematoriums
- Registering of births and deaths
- Conservation of heritage sites
- Disease control, including immunisation
- Public municipal schools etc.
