= Jaynagar Institution =

School in West Bengal, India

Location
- Jaynagar Majilpur, South 24 Parganas, West Bengal, 743337; India
- Coordinates: 22.1733561°N 88.4190426°E

Information
- Type: Government-aided integrated school
- Established: 1878; 148 years ago
- School board: Department of School Education
- Authority: Government of West Bengal
- Category: Higher secondary
- Grades: V to XII
- Gender: Male
- Language: Bengali
- Campus type: Urban
- Colors: White; Dark Red
- Affiliation: WBBSE; WBCHSE

Jaynagar Institution (abbreviated as JI) is a government-sponsored high school in the Jaynagar Majilpur of the South 24 Parganas district in the Indian state of West Bengal. This is a boys' only school for the secondary and higher secondary level students. Its medium of instruction is Bengali. The institution played a key role during Bengal Renaissance period. It was once considered one of the best Bengali medium schools in the Greater Kolkata and continues to be a good one. The campus includes a fairly large play-ground and the school offers variety of extracurricular activities for its students. The school has produced many well known academics, film and theater personalities, journalist and musicians.

== Geography ==
Jaynagar Institution is located at 22°10′24″N 88°25′09″E. It has an average elevation of 8 metres (26 ft).

== History ==
Jaynagar Institution was established in 1878; 148 years ago. It is one of the oldest schools in the whole country.

== Affiliations ==
The school is affiliated to the West Bengal Board of Secondary Education for secondary level students, and to the West Bengal Council of Higher Secondary Education for higher secondary level students.

== See also ==
- List of schools in West Bengal
