= Jogindranath Sarkar =

Indian Bengali author

- যোগীন্দ্রনাথ সরকার
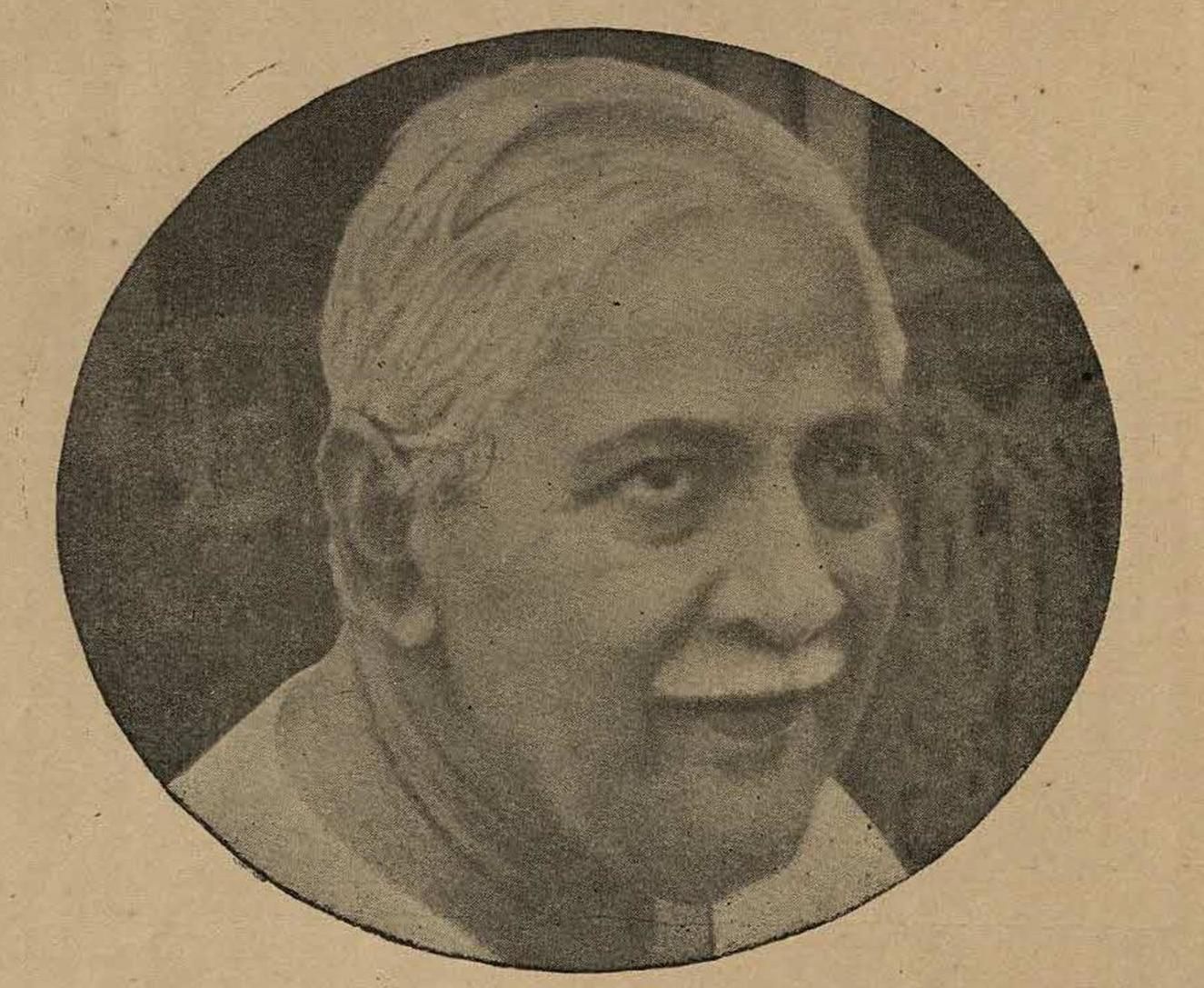
- Born: 28 October 1866; Netra, 24 Parganas, British India
- Died: 26 June 1937 (aged 70); Calcutta, British India
- Education: City College, Kolkata
- Occupation: Children's author
- Writing career
- Language: Bengali
- Subject: Literature
- Notable work: Hashi Khushi (1897)
- Literary movement: Bengal Renaissance

Jogindranath Sarkar (28 October 1866 – 26 June 1937) was a Bengali children's author. He wrote more than seventy books.

== Early life and education ==
Son of Nandalal Sarkar, a native of Jaynagar Majilpur, he was born in the house of his maternal uncle in Netra village of South 24 Parganas district, on 28 October 1866. His father came from an impoverished family in Jessore and later settled in Jaynagar. Doctor and philanthropist Sir Nilratan Sircar was Jogindranath's elder brother. Jogindranath was a member of the Brahmo Samaj.

Jogindranath studied at Deoghar High School and was admitted to City College, but was unable to complete his degree.

== Career and writings ==
He then began teaching at City Collegiate School, Kolkata, and became interested in writing children's literature at around the same time. He was adept at nonsense verse. His work was published in various Bengali children's magazines, including Sandesh. He was also the editor of the children's magazine Mukul.

Popular books include Hasi Khushi (1897), and his illustrated books of poetry Khukumanir Chhada (1899) and Hasirashi (1899). Other books for children include Chhabi-O-Galpo (1892), Ranga Chhabi (1896), Pashu-Paksi (1911), Bane-Jangale (1929), Galpa Sanchay, Shishu Chayanika, Hijibiji, and others. In addition, he wrote schoolbooks for children, among them Gyanamukul (1890), Charupath, and Shiksa Sanchay.

In 1896 Jogindranath established the City Book Society, which published Upendrakishore Ray Chowdhury's debut book Chheleder Ramayana, an adaptation of the Ramayana for young readers.

Despite suffering from hemiplegia from 1923, Jogindranath continued to write and publish until his death in 1937.
