= Kanailal Bhattacharjee =

Indian revolutionary and Martyr (1909-1931)

Kanailal Bhattacharjee/ Bhattacharya
- কানাইলাল ভট্টাচার্য
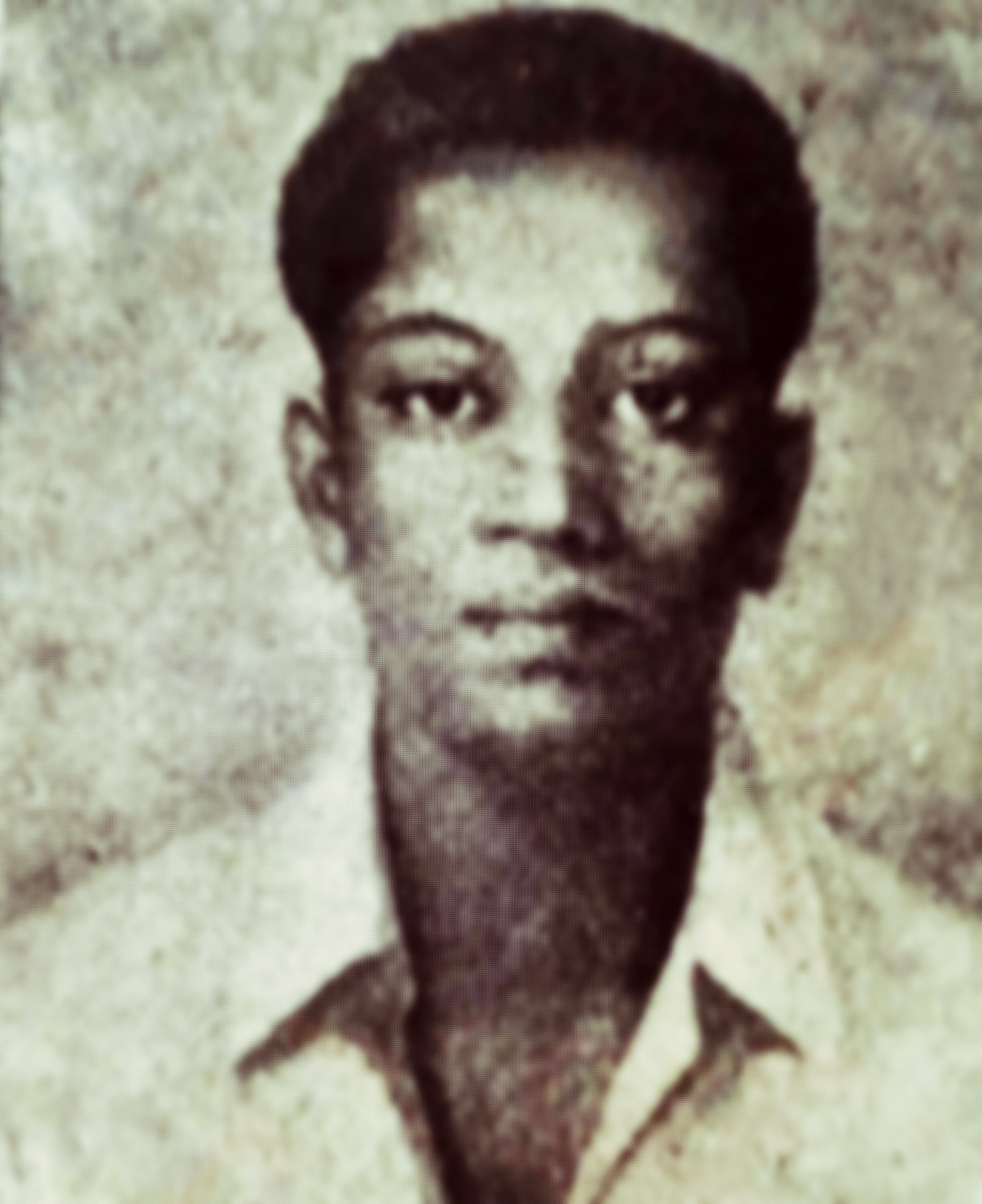
- Kanailal Bhattacharjee/ Bhattacharya
- Born: 1909; Majilpur, Bengal Presidency, British India (present-day South 24 Parganas, West Bengal, India)
- Died: 27 July 1931 (aged 21–22); Calcutta, Bengal Presidency, British India (present-day Kolkata, West Bengal)
- Cause of death: Suicide by consuming potassium cyanide
- Organization: Jugantar
- Known for: Indian freedom fighter
- Movement: Indian independence movement

Kanailal Bhattacharjee (Bengali: কানাইলাল ভট্টাচার্য) (1909 – 27 July 1931) was an Indian Bengali revolutionary nationalist who fought against British rule over India.

== Early life ==
Kanailal belonged to a very poor family of Majilpur in South 24 Parganas District in present-day West Bengal. He was born to Nagendranath Bhattacharya. He joined freedom revolution movement when he was very young. He came in contact with revolutionaries like Sunil Chatterjee, Satkari Bandyopadhyay, Bhutnath Bhattachatyya and soon he became a fighter of revolution movement. He was a student of Majilpur J. M. Training School.

== Killing R. R. Galik ==
Kanailal Bhattacharya killed R. R. Galik (born 1876), a judge of the Alipore court, on 27 July 1931.

Judge Galik sentenced Dinesh Gupta and Ramakrishna Biswas, two Indian revolutionaries, to death by hanging for the murder of Col. N.S. Simpson. Kanailal sought to avenge the death of Dinesh by shooting the judge that sentenced him. During the assassination, Kanailal was shot by a guard sergeant.

A piece of paper was found in his pocket that read "Your death is your reward for hanging Dinesh Gupta". Kanailal carried out the assassination under alias Bimal Dasgupta, who was at the time, a fugitive accused by the British in the murder of District Magistrate Pedi of Midnapore. During the identification, Kanailal's mother, Katyoni Devi denied his body as her son. Kanailal was a member of the Bengal Volunteers Team.

== Social reflections ==
In fond of the memory of Bhattacharya, the "Alipur Bekar Road" was renamed "Biplabi Kanailal Bhattacharya Road". A road in Majilpur carries his name as well. A bronze statue in his image can be found in Dutta Bazar of Majilpur near his ancestor's house.
