= Bamanghata =

- Village
- Location in West Bengal Location in India
- Coordinates: 22.5263°N 88.4716°E
- Country: India
- State: West Bengal
- District: South 24 Parganas
- CD Block: Bhangar II
- Elevation: 9 m (30 ft)

Languages
  - Official: Bengali
  - Additional official: English
- Time zone: UTC+5:30 (IST)
- PIN: 700150
- Telephone code: +91 33
- Vehicle registration: WB-19 to WB-22, WB-95 to WB-99
- Lok Sabha constituency: Jadavpur
- Vidhan Sabha constituency: Bhangar
- Website: www.s24pgs.gov.in

Bamanghata is a village and a gram panchayat within the jurisdiction of the Bhangar police station in the Bhangar II CD block in the Baruipur subdivision of the South 24 Parganas district in the Indian state of West Bengal.

== Geography ==
Bamanghata is located at 22°31′35″N 88°28′18″E. It has an average elevation of 9 metres (30 ft).

== Transport ==
Bamanghata is on the State Highway 3.

== Healthcare ==
Jirongachhi Rural Hospital, with 30 beds, at Jirongachhi, is the major government medical facility in the Bhangar II CD block.
