= Dakshin Barasat =

South Barasat
- Village
- Location in West Bengal Location in India
- Coordinates: 22.2327°N 88.4451°E
- Country: India
- State: West Bengal
- District: South 24 Parganas
- CD block: Jaynagar I
- Elevation: 8 m (26 ft)

Languages
  - Official: Bengali
  - Additional official: English
- Time zone: UTC+5:30 (IST)
- PIN: 743372
- Telephone code: +91 3218
- Vehicle registration: WB-19 to WB-22, WB-95 to WB-99
- Lok Sabha constituency: Jaynagar (SC)
- Vidhan Sabha constituency: Jaynagar (SC)
- Website: www.s24pgs.gov.in

South Barasat is a village and a gram panchayat within the jurisdiction of the Jaynagar Majilpur police station in the Jaynagar I CD block in the Baruipur subdivision of the South 24 Parganas district in the Indian state of West Bengal.

== Geography ==
Cities and towns in the southern part of Baruipur subdivision (including Baruipur, Jaynagar I & II, Kultali CD blocks) in South 24 Parganas district
M: municipal city/ town, CT: census town, R: rural/ urban centre, N: neighbourhood, H: historical place/ religious centre
Places linked with coastal activity are marked in blue
Owing to space constraints in the small map, the actual locations in a larger map may vary slightly

=== Area overview ===
Baruipur subdivision is a rural subdivision with moderate levels of urbanization. 31.05% of the population lives in the urban areas and 68.95% lives in the rural areas. In the southern portion of the subdivision (shown in the map alongside) there are 20 census towns. The entire district is situated in the Ganges Delta and the southern part is covered by the Baruipur-Jaynagar Plain. Archaeological excavations at Dhosa and Tilpi, on the bank of the Piyali River indicate the existence of human habitation around 2,000 years ago.

Note: The map alongside presents some of the notable locations in the subdivision. All places marked in the map are linked in the larger full screen map.

=== Location ===
Dakshin Barasat is located at 22.2327°N 88.4451°E.

Dakshin Barasat is not identified as a separate town in 2011 census. As per the map of the Jaynagar I CD block, it seems to be a part of Raynagar.

== Transport ==
Dakshin Barasat is on the State Highway 1.

Dakshin Barasat railway station is on the Sealdah–Namkhana line of the Kolkata Suburban Railway system.

=== Commuters ===
With the electrification of the railways, suburban traffic has grown tremendously since the 1960s. As of 2005-06, more than 1.7 million (17 lakhs) commuters use the Kolkata Suburban Railway system daily. After the partition of India, refugees from erstwhile East Pakistan and Bangladesh had a strong impact on the development of urban areas in the periphery of Kolkata. The new immigrants depended on Kolkata for their livelihood, thus increasing the number of commuters. Eastern Railway runs 1,272 EMU trains daily.

== Education ==
Dhruba Chand Halder College, established in 1965, is affiliated with the University of Calcutta. It is located near Dakshin Barasat railway station. It offers honours courses in Bengali, English, Sanskrit, history, political science, philosophy, education, physics, chemistry, mathematics, zoology, botany, micro biology, economics, geography and accounting & finance, and general courses in arts, science and commerce.

== Healthcare ==
Padmerhat Rural Hospital, with 30 beds, at Padmerhat, is the major government medical facility in the Jaynagar I CD block.
