= Jaynagar Majilpur =

City in West Bengal, India

- City
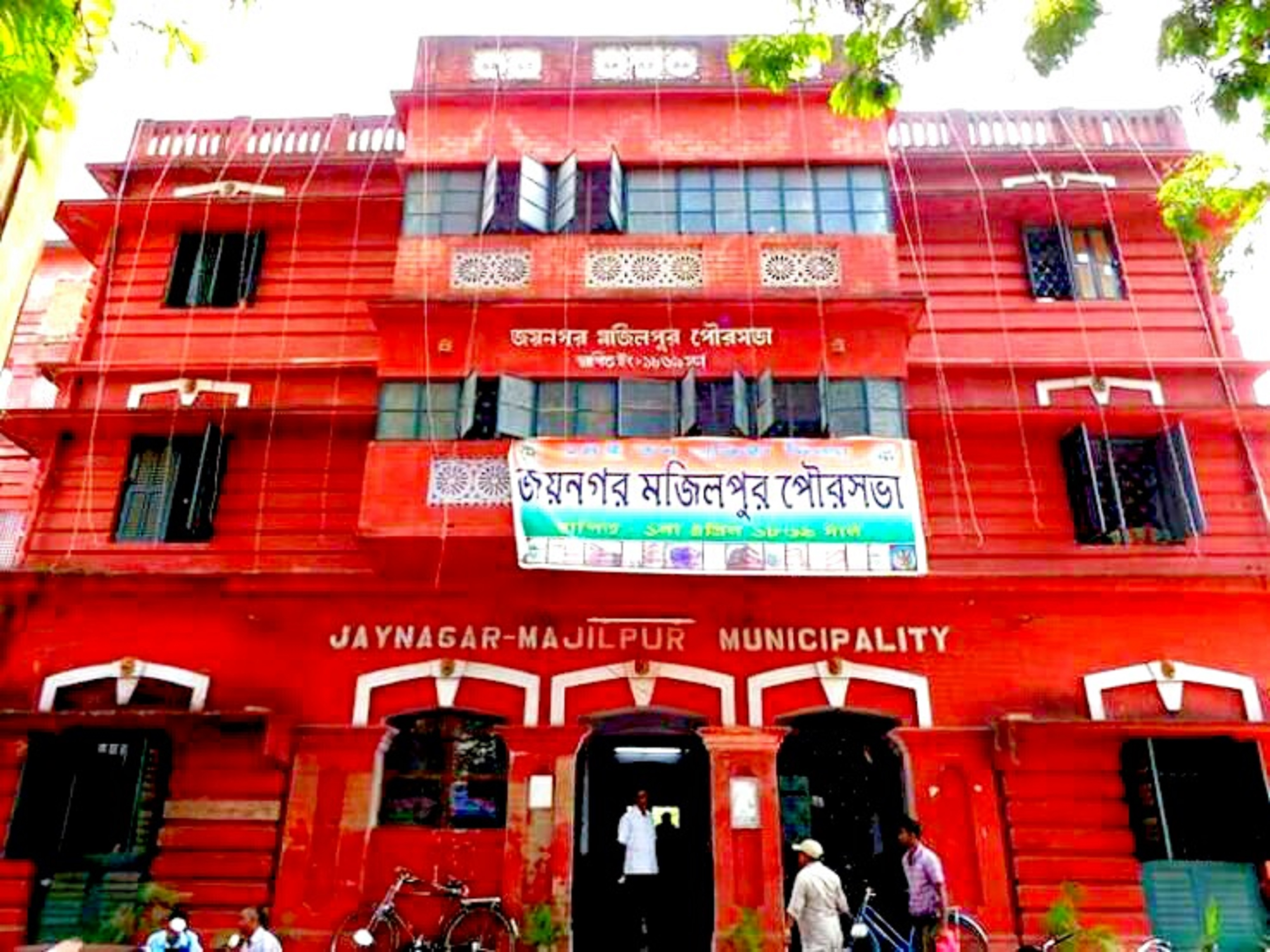
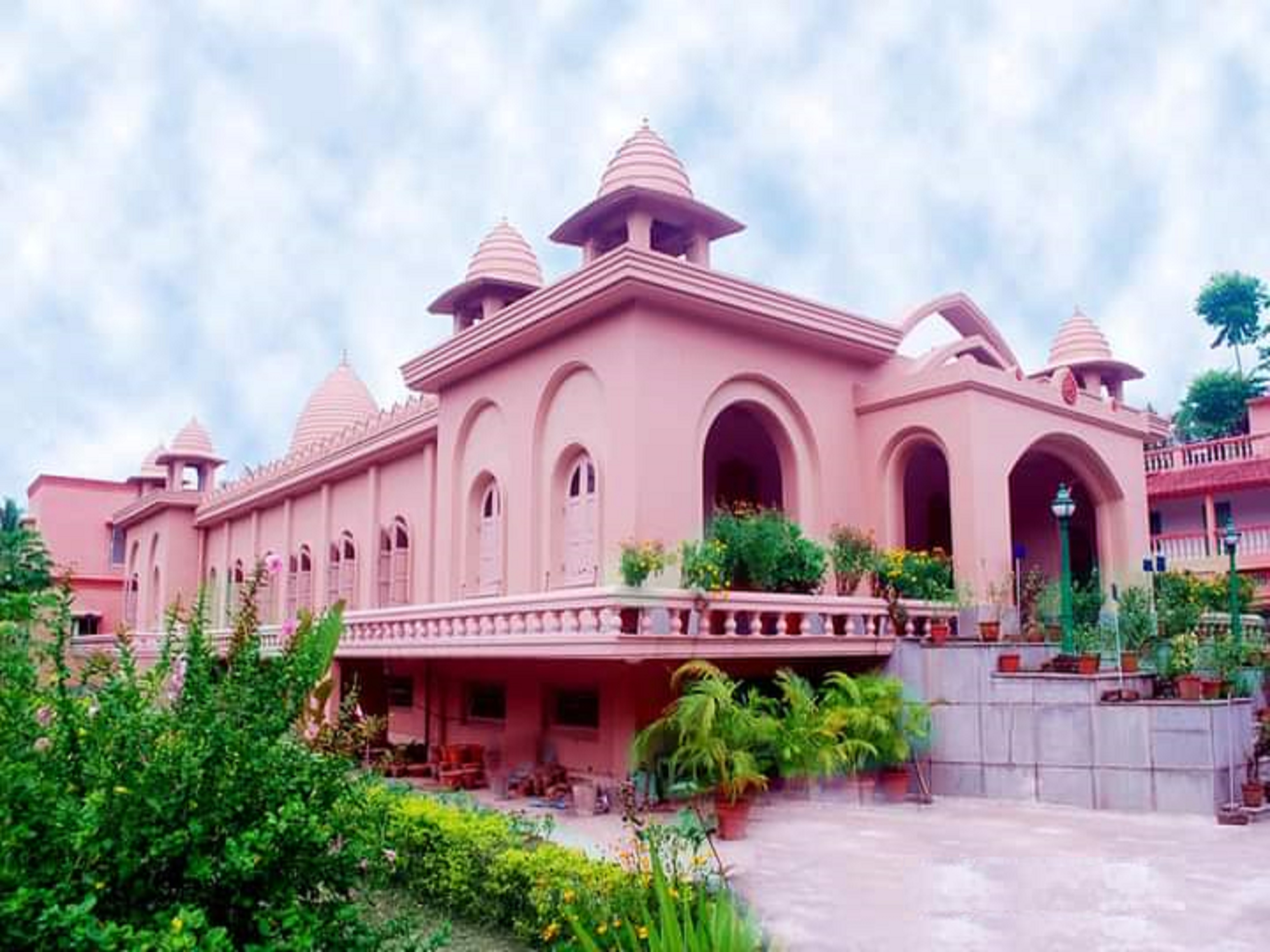
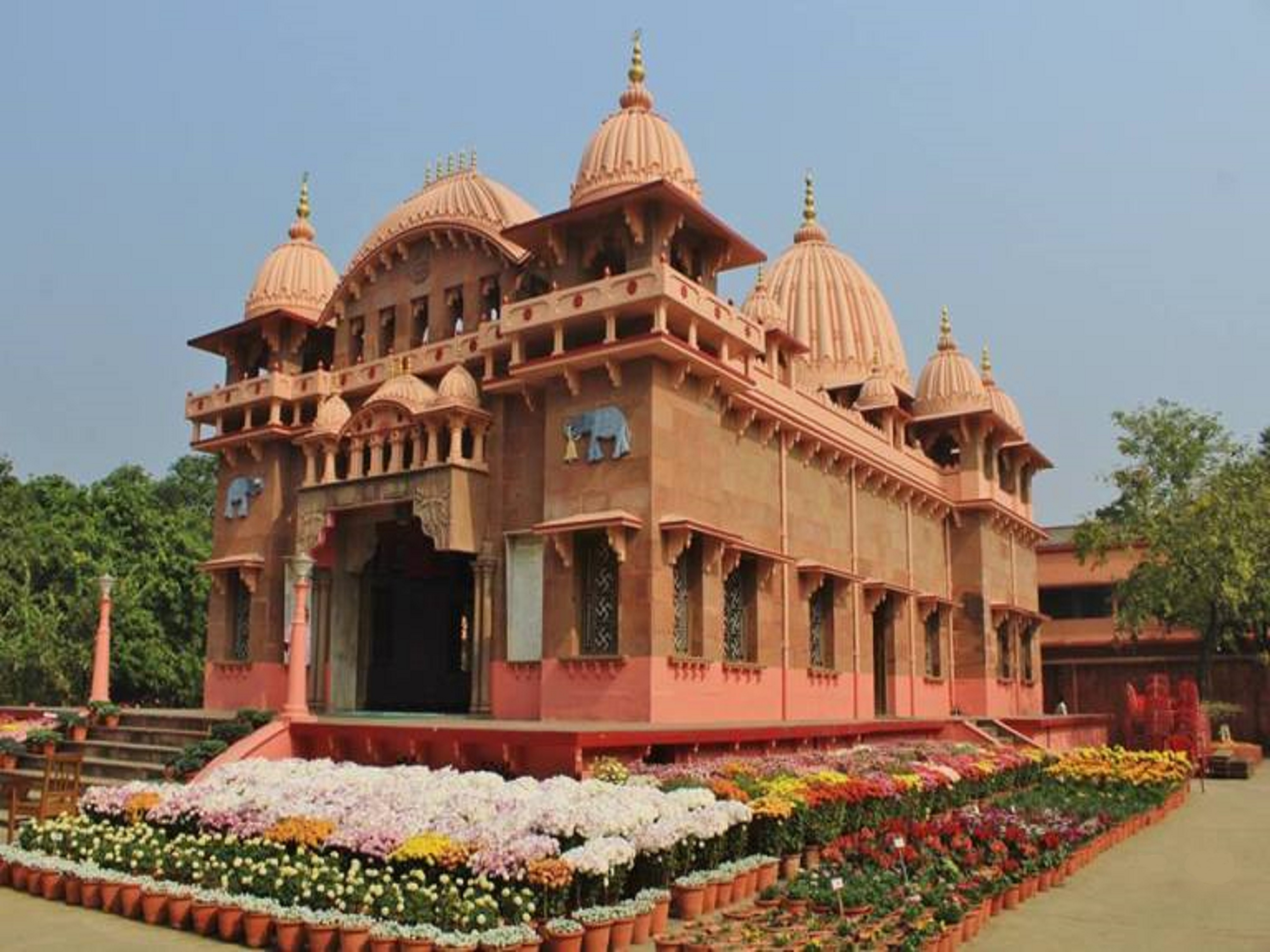
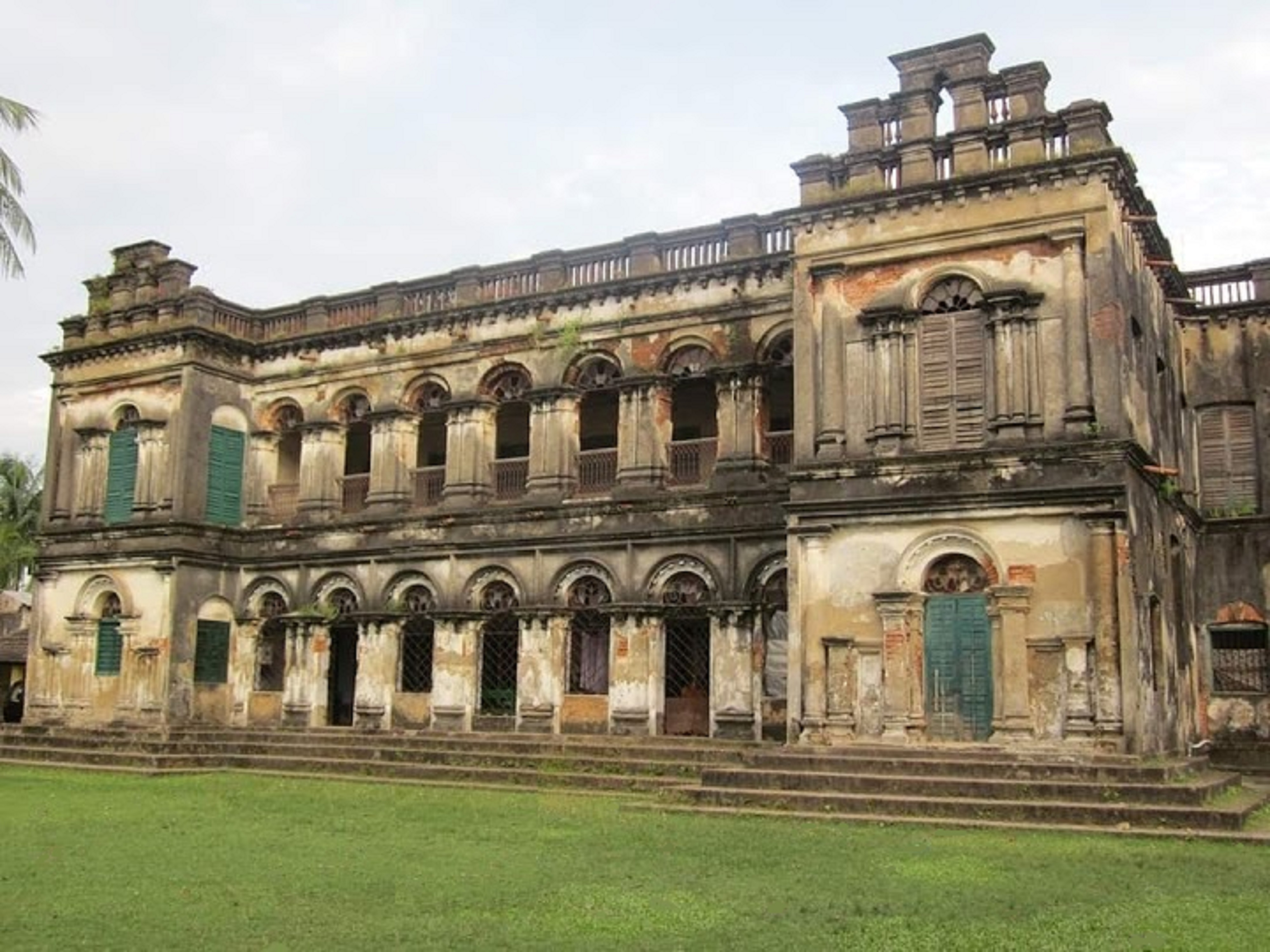
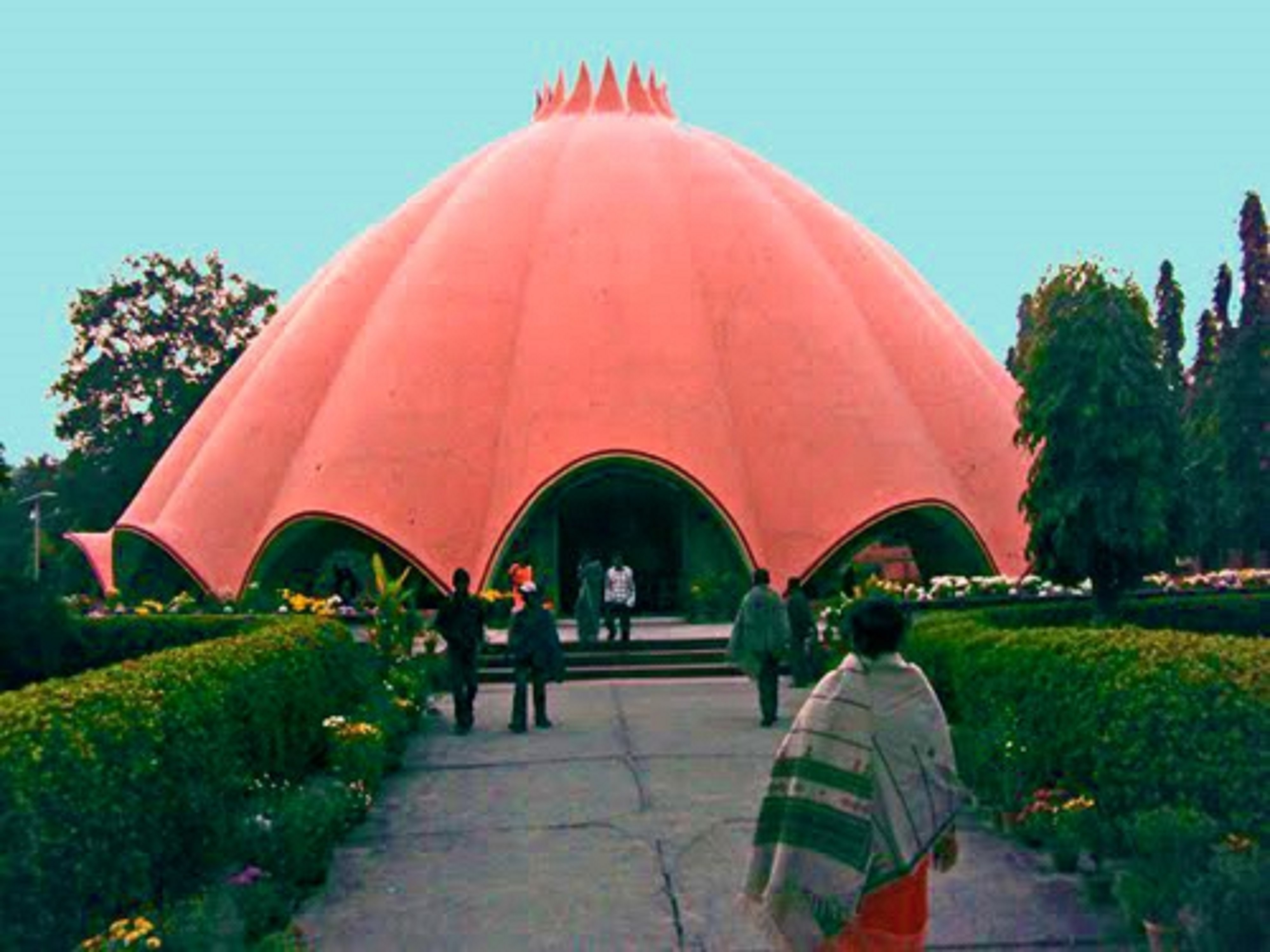
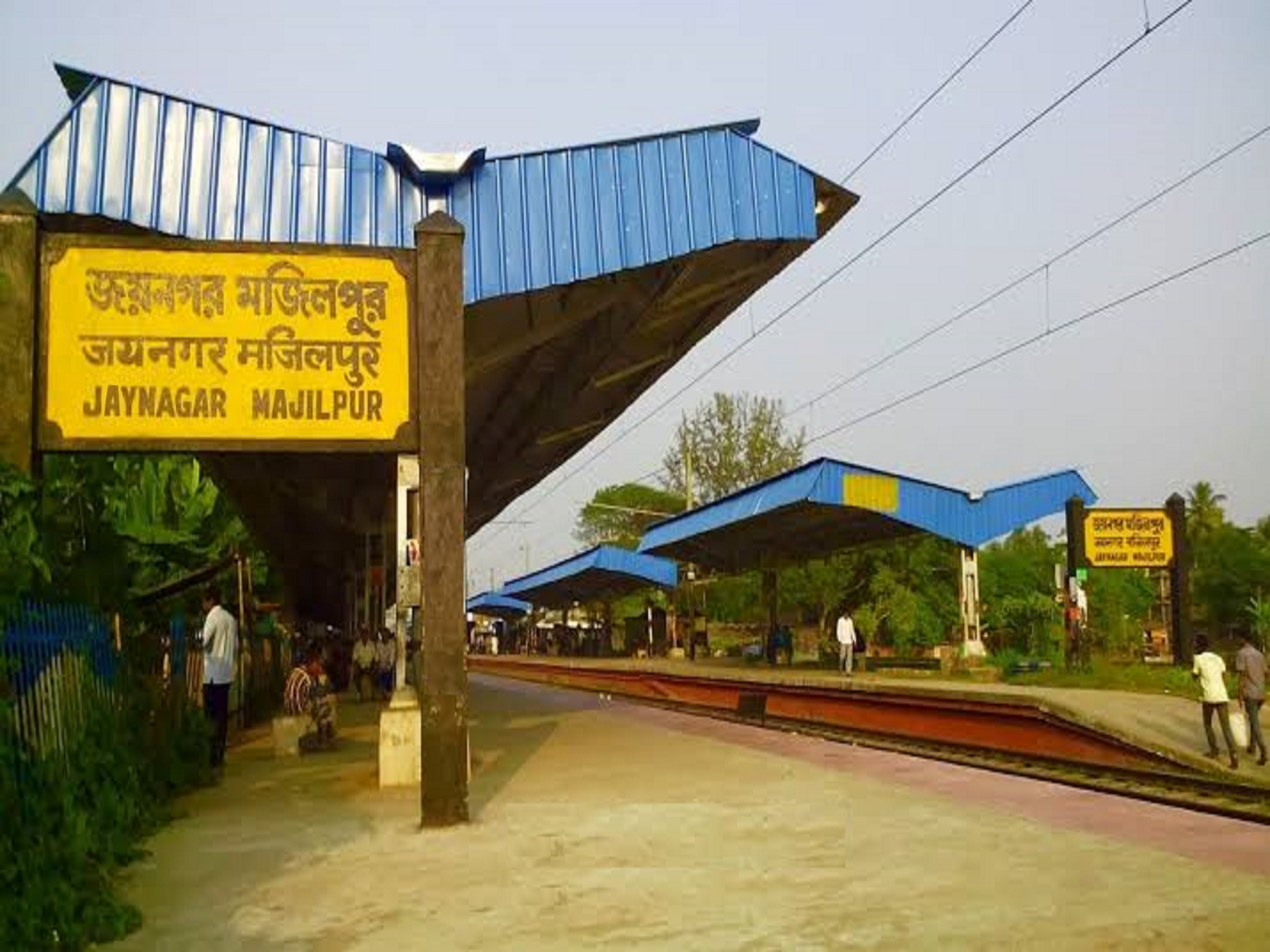
- Clockwise from top: Jaynagar Majilpur Municipality, Ramkrishna Ashram, Indira Gandhi Community Hall, Jaynagar Majilpur Railway Station, Dutta Bari, Sarada Ashram
- Interactive map of Jaynagar Majilpur
- Location in West Bengal Location in India Location in Asia Location in Earth
- Coordinates: 22°10′31″N 88°25′12″E
- Country: India
- State: West Bengal
- Division: Presidency
- District: South 24 Parganas

Government
  - Type: Municipality
  - Body: Jaynagar Majilpur Municipality

Area
  - Total: 5.85 km^{2} (2.26 sq mi)
- Elevation: 8 m (26 ft)

Population (2011)
  - Total: 25,922
  - Density: 4,430/km^{2} (11,500/sq mi)

Demographics
  - Literacy: 88.38 per cent
  - Sex ratio: 959 ♂/♀

Languages
  - Official: Bengali
  - Additional official: English
- Time zone: UTC+5:30 (IST)
- PIN: 743337
- Telephone code: +91 3218
- Vehicle registration: WB-19, WB-20, WB-95, WB-96, WB-97, WB-98
- Lok Sabha constituency: Jaynagar
- Vidhan Sabha constituency: Jaynagar
- Website: joynagarmozilpurmunicipality.com

Jaynagar Majilpur (Bengali: [d͡ʒɔe̯nɔgoɾ mod͡ʒɪlpuɾ]) is a city and a municipality of South 24 Parganas district in the Indian state of West Bengal. It is situated in the southern suburbs of Kolkata. As an urban setup in the vicinity of Kolkata, the city is within the area of Greater Kolkata. It is a part of the area covered by Kolkata Metropolitan Development Authority (KMDA). The city is famous for its confectionery called Jaynagarer Moa.

== Etymology ==
Jaynagar is an ancient settlement. The name of Jaynagar comes from the name of the local goddess Joychandi, from which the city derived the name, Joychanditala. Over time it became Joychandinagar and then Joynagar or Jaynagar.

Another ancient settlement is Majilpur. The etymology of the name is an interesting one. Originally the Ganges would flow over where the city is, but slowly it started silting down. This silting is called Moje Jaoa in Bengali language, from which the city derived the name, Mojapur. Over time it became Mojpur, Mojipur and then Mojilpur or Majilpur.

== History ==
Many janapadas grew up along the old Bhagirathi channel from the ancient times until around the 16th century: Kalighat, Boral, Rajpur, Harinavi, Mahinagar, Baruipur, Baharu, Jaynagar, Majilpur, Chhatrabhog etc. Bipradas Pipilai's Manasavijaya, composed in 1495, mentions many places in this region. Chand Sadagar, a merchant character of the Manasavijaya, reached Baruipur, from Kalighat, through the old Bhagirathi channel. From there he proceeded towards Chhatrabhog, and then travelling through Hatiagarh pargana reached the open sea. Chaitanyadeva (1486–1534) also went through this route. Travelling by boat to Puri he halted at the village of Atisara, near Baruipur. His last stoppage in 24 Parganas was at Chhatrabhog. Chhatrabhog seems to have been an important river-port on the old Bhagirathi channel. Rama Chandra Khan, the zamindar of Chhatrabhog, helped Chaitanyadeva to continue with his journey.

To the west of the Sealdah–Namkhana railway line lies Jaynagar, and to the east lies Majilpur. Jaynagar, predominantly inhabited by Kayasthas, is ancient, whereas Majilpur, largely Brahmin-dominated, is comparatively recent. While Jaynagar finds mention in the Mangal-Kāvyas of the sixteenth–seventeenth centuries, Majilpur does not. At one time, the powerful stream of the Adi Ganga flowed through the heart of both Jaynagar and Majilpur. Today this river is almost dead, and people have taken over its course and are maintaining it like ponds under names such as Mitra Ganga, Motilal Ganga, Ghosh Ganga, and Bose Ganga. Situated along the ancient course of the Adi Ganga and forming part of the Sundarbans hinterland, this region was once covered with dense forests. In those days, ships of Portuguese traders used to ply along the Adi Ganga and, near the village of Andul, reached Saptagram in present-day Hooghly district via the channel now known as the Sankrail Canal. In 1750, when nawab Alivardi Khan diverted the main course of the Ganges by cutting a canal near Betor, carrying the waters through the dead channel of the Saraswati River past Budge Budge, Falta and Diamond Harbour to finally merge with the Muri Ganga near the Gangasagar, the death knell of the Adi Ganga began to sound. Coincidentally, foreign pirates—Mog, Portuguese and French—who arrived via this waterway often carried out looting and terror in Jaynagar and hid in the nearby forest-covered region of Magrahat. Magrahat derives its name from these Mog pirates. However, most of the inhabitants of Jaynagar Majilpur came from outside: just as the Motilals and the Duttas migrated from Jessore, the Mitras came from Barisha in Behala. Moreover, due to the sanctity of the Adi Ganga and the presence of temples and cremation grounds along its banks, devout Brahmins also settled here.

The name of Jaynagar is first mentioned in the Manasavijaya composed by Bipradas Pipilai. Towards the end of the tenth century, king Nilkantha Motilal of Jaynagar, as a feudatory ruler, governed a portion of the vast territory of king Subuddhi Ray’s Raynagar kingdom, which extended from Raimangal in the east to the Saraswati River in the west. In the early eleventh century, when the entire Ganges Delta was submerged by massive floods, most of the Raynagar kingdom became deserted. Even the clan deity of the Motilal family, Joychandi, was swept away. Soon after, when king Nilkantha Motilal lost his life in a war in Magadha, his brother migrated with his family to Jessore. Several generations later, in the early sixteenth century, Gunananda Motilal, a worthy descendant of that lineage, was travelling by boat along the Adi Ganga for trade when evening fell and he anchored his barge on the riverbank. That night, in a dream, he was divinely informed that their lost clan deity, Joychandi, was residing in the form of a stone on the riverbank in that region. Following the divine instruction, Gunananda entered the forest the next morning with guards. At that time, Jaynagar was covered with dense jungle. There, beneath a bakul tree in the forest, he discovered the stone fragment of goddess Joychandi. On seeing it, Gunananda decided to install a wooden idol of the goddess, carved from bakul wood, and to establish a temple. He wished to personally supervise the work, but this was not possible from Jessore. Hence, he planned to build his own residence beside the temple and began living there with his family. He later brought Tunu Pandit and his family from Jessore to perform the daily worship of the goddess. Since then, the uninterrupted daily service and worship of goddess Joychandi have continued to this day. Jaynagar derives its name from this very deity, Joychandi. After the Motilal lineage, the Kayastha Sen family and the Mitra lineage from Barisha settled here. The Radhaballabh Temple and the Dwadash Shiva Temples, established by the Mitra family, still exist today.

To the east of Jaynagar lies Majilpur. The place was formed on the silted bed of the Adi Ganga, hence the name Majilpur. In the early seventeenth century, when the Mughal emperor Akbar’s general Man Singh attacked Jessore, maharaja Pratapaditya’s dewan, Chandraketu Dutta, moved to this forested island of the Sundarbans for self-preservation. Along with him came his family priest, Shri Krishna Udgata, and two Brahmins of the Dakshinatya Vedic tradition—Raghunandan Pota and another. Through the efforts of the Dutta, Udgata and Pota families, Majilpur gradually rose to prominence. In later times, the descendants of the Udgatas adopted the surnames Bhattacharya and Brahmachari, while the descendants of the Potas took the surname Chakraborty. Even in the early eighteenth century, the flow of the Adi Ganga was still present here. The riverbanks were then densely forested and secluded. At that time, a tantric practitioner named Swami Bhairavananda, finding the place ideal for meditation, began his spiritual practice here. After some time, he received a divine revelation in a dream that goddess Kali lay neglected in the deep waters of the nearby Padma Pukur. Upon searching, Swami Bhairavananda discovered an ancient black stone idol of goddess Kali and installed it in a small hut he had built himself. Before leaving for another place to continue his spiritual pursuits, he entrusted the worship of the idol to his disciple Rajendralal Chakraborty, a descendant of the Pota family. In the mid-eighteenth century, Rajendralal again received a divine command and, as instructed by the goddess, built a wooden idol and a temple for her using neem wood lying beside the Padma Pukur. Pleased with Rajendralal’s devotion, goddess Kali bestowed upon him a divine medicine that could cure various incurable diseases. As the medicine worked like that of Dhanwantari, the idol came to be known as Dhanwantari Kali, and the temple was named Dhanwantari Kalibari. Every year, in the month of Boishakh, a grand fair lasting a fortnight is held centred on this Kali idol. From Shukla Pratipada to Purnima, the goddess is presented in different forms each day. Since the goddess’s attire (besh) is changed daily, the fair is popularly known as the Besher Mela.

The zamindari of the famous Dutta family of Majilpur, established on the silted channel of the Adi Ganga, is well recorded in history. However, their zamindari eventually came to an end due to their oppressive and undisciplined way of life. In particular, their inhuman cruelty towards maidservants and concubines was one of the main reasons for the downfall of the Dutta rule. Nevertheless, the Dutta family produced many illustrious figures, such as the historian Kalidas Dutta, and maintained associations with several noble individuals. When the great novelist Bankim Chandra Chatterjee served as the Subdivisional Magistrate of Baruipur, he stayed for a considerable period as a guest of the Dutta family. He chose their zamindari estate and its surroundings as the background for his famous novel Bishabriksha, and even today many similarities between the novel and the estate can be traced.

Jaynagar Majilpur is renowned for its Moa sweets; and is a memorable place in history for its role in India’s freedom struggle. It was the birthplace of many revolutionaries and martyrs and played an active role in the armed revolutionary movement. The renowned freedom fighter Kanailal Bhattacharjee grew up in this city. Besides him, personalities such as philosopher Sivanath Shastri, doctor Nilratan Sircar, poet Shakti Chattopadhyay, musician Hemant Kumar, and singer Nirmala Mishra were all born on this land.

== Geography ==
Cities and towns in the southern part of Baruipur subdivision (including Baruipur, Jaynagar I & II, Kultali CD blocks) in South 24 Parganas district
M: municipal city/ town, CT: census town, R: rural/ urban centre, N: neighbourhood, H: historical place/ religious centre
Places linked with coastal activity are marked in blue
Owing to space constraints in the small map, the actual locations in a larger map may vary slightly

=== Area overview ===
Baruipur subdivision is a rural subdivision with moderate levels of urbanisation. 31.05% of the population live in the urban areas and 68.95% live in the rural areas. In the southern portion of the subdivision (shown in the map alongside) there are 20 census towns. The entire district is situated in the Ganges Delta and the southern part is covered by the Baruipur-Jaynagar Plain. Archaeological excavations at Dhosa and Tilpi, on the bank of the Piyali River indicate the existence of human habitation around 2,000 years ago.

Note: The map alongside presents some of the notable locations in the subdivision. All places marked in the map are linked in the larger full screen map.

=== Location ===
Jaynagar Majilpur is located at 22°10′31″N 88°25′12″E. It has an average elevation of 8 metres (26 ft).

Raynagar, Kalikapur Barasat, Baharu, Uttarparanij, Alipur and Uttar Durgapur, all in the Jaynagar I CD block, are adjacent to Jaynagar Majilpur. Nimpith and Tulshighata, both in the Jaynagar II CD block, are very close to Jaynagar Majilpur. These nine locations (eight census towns and a municipal city) virtually form a cluster.

=== Climate ===
Jaynagar Majilpur is subject to a tropical wet-and-dry climate that is designated Aw under the Köppen climate classification. According to a United Nations Development Programme report, its wind and cyclone zone is very high damage risk.

==== Temperature ====
The annual mean temperature is 26.8 °C (80.2 °F); monthly mean temperatures are 19 to 30 °C (66 to 86 °F). Summers (March–June) are hot and humid, with temperatures in the low 30s Celsius; during dry spells, maximum temperatures often exceed 40 °C (104 °F) in May and June. Winter lasts for roughly 2 1/2 months, with seasonal lows dipping to 9 to 11 °C (48 to 52 °F) in December and January. May is the hottest month, with daily temperatures ranging from 27 to 37 °C (81 to 99 °F); January, the coldest month, has temperatures varying from 12 to 23 °C (54 to 73 °F). The highest recorded temperature is 43.9 °C (111.0 °F), and the lowest is 5 °C (41 °F). The winter is mild and very comfortable weather pertains over the city throughout this season. Often, in April–June, the city is struck by heavy rains or dusty squalls that are followed by thunderstorms or hailstorms, bringing cooling relief from the prevailing humidity. These thunderstorms are convective in nature, and are known locally as Kal'bôishakhi, or Nor'westers in English.

==== Rainfall ====
Rains brought by the Bay of Bengal branch of the south-west summer monsoon lash Jaynagar Majilpur between June and September, supplying it with most of its annual rainfall of about 1,850 mm (73 in). The highest monthly rainfall total occurs in July and August. In these months often incessant rain for days brings live to a stall for the city dwellers. The city receives 2,528 hours of sunshine per year, with maximum sunlight exposure occurring in March. Jaynagar Majilpur has been hit by several cyclones; these include systems occurring in 1737 and 1864 that killed thousands.

Climate data for Jaynagar Majilpur
Month	Jan	Feb	Mar	Apr	May	Jun	Jul	Aug	Sep	Oct	Nov	Dec	Year
Record high °C (°F)	32.8 (91.0)	38.4 (101.1)	41.1 (106.0)	43.3 (109.9)	43.7 (110.7)	43.9 (111.0)	39.9 (103.8)	38.4 (101.1)	38.9 (102.0)	39.0 (102.2)	34.9 (94.8)	32.5 (90.5)	43.9 (111.0)
Mean maximum °C (°F)	29.8 (85.6)	33.5 (92.3)	37.4 (99.3)	38.5 (101.3)	38.8 (101.8)	38.0 (100.4)	35.9 (96.6)	35.0 (95.0)	35.3 (95.5)	35.1 (95.2)	32.9 (91.2)	29.8 (85.6)	39.8 (103.6)
Mean daily maximum °C (°F)	25.8 (78.4)	29.2 (84.6)	33.5 (92.3)	35.3 (95.5)	35.3 (95.5)	33.8 (92.8)	32.4 (90.3)	32.2 (90.0)	32.4 (90.3)	32.2 (90.0)	30.1 (86.2)	27.0 (80.6)	31.6 (88.9)
Daily mean °C (°F)	20.0 (68.0)	23.6 (74.5)	28.0 (82.4)	30.4 (86.7)	30.9 (87.6)	30.4 (86.7)	29.4 (84.9)	29.3 (84.7)	29.2 (84.6)	28.1 (82.6)	25.0 (77.0)	21.2 (70.2)	27.1 (80.8)
Mean daily minimum °C (°F)	14.1 (57.4)	17.8 (64.0)	22.4 (72.3)	25.3 (77.5)	26.4 (79.5)	26.8 (80.2)	26.5 (79.7)	26.4 (79.5)	26.0 (78.8)	24.1 (75.4)	19.7 (67.5)	15.2 (59.4)	22.6 (72.7)
Mean minimum °C (°F)	10.7 (51.3)	12.9 (55.2)	17.6 (63.7)	20.4 (68.7)	21.5 (70.7)	23.7 (74.7)	24.3 (75.7)	24.4 (75.9)	23.8 (74.8)	20.6 (69.1)	15.4 (59.7)	11.8 (53.2)	10.4 (50.7)
Record low °C (°F)	6.7 (44.1)	7.2 (45.0)	10.0 (50.0)	16.1 (61.0)	17.9 (64.2)	20.4 (68.7)	20.6 (69.1)	22.6 (72.7)	20.6 (69.1)	17.2 (63.0)	10.6 (51.1)	7.2 (45.0)	6.7 (44.1)
Average rainfall mm (inches)	10.4 (0.41)	20.9 (0.82)	35.2 (1.39)	58.9 (2.32)	133.1 (5.24)	300.6 (11.83)	396.0 (15.59)	344.5 (13.56)	318.1 (12.52)	180.5 (7.11)	35.1 (1.38)	3.2 (0.13)	1,836.5 (72.30)
Average rainy days	1.1	1.7	2.2	3.4	7.0	12.8	17.7	16.9	13.9	7.4	1.3	0.5	85.9
Average relative humidity (%) (at 17:30 IST)	61	54	51	62	68	77	82	83	82	75	67	65	69
Mean monthly sunshine hours	213.9	211.9	229.4	240.0	232.5	135.0	105.4	117.8	126.0	201.5	216.0	204.6	2,234
Mean daily sunshine hours	6.9	7.5	7.4	8.0	7.5	4.5	3.4	3.8	4.2	6.5	7.2	6.6	6.1
Source: Climate-Data.org (altitude: 8 m)

== Demographics ==
=== Population ===
Historical population
Year	Pop.	±%
1901	8,810	—
1911	9,245	+4.9%
1921	8,408	−9.1%
1931	9,755	+16.0%
1941	14,218	+45.8%
1951	13,355	−6.1%
1961	14,177	+6.2%
1971	15,218	+7.3%
1981	16,343	+7.4%
1991	20,217	+23.7%
2001	23,315	+15.3%
2011	25,922	+11.2%
Source: Census of India

According to the 2011 Census of India, Jaynagar Majilpur had a total population of 25,922, of which 13,234 (51.05%) were males and 12,688 (48.95%) were females. It had a population density of 4,431 inhabitants per square kilometre (11,480/sq mi) with a sex ratio of 959 females for every 1000 males. There were 2,277 persons in the age range of 0 to 6 years which is 8.78% of the total population. The Scheduled Castes numbered 4,830 (18.63%) and the Scheduled Tribes numbered 24 (0.09%). The total number of literate persons was 20,898 (88.38% of the population over 6 years) out of which males numbered 11,092 (91.96% of the male population over 6 years) and females numbered 9,806 (84.66% of the female population over 6 years). Jaynagar Majilpur had a total of 6,036 households as per report released by 2011 Census of India.

=== Language ===
Languages of Jaynagar Majilpur (2011)
1. Bengali (99.1%)
2. Hindi (0.82%)
3. Urdu (0.03%)
4. Others (0.01%)

At the time of the 2011 Census of India, 99.14% of the population spoke Bengali, 0.82% Hindi and 0.03% Urdu as their first language.

=== Religion ===
Religion in Jaynagar Majilpur (2011)
Religion	Percent
Hinduism	81.34%
Islam	18.23%
Christianity	0.17%
Sikhism	0.04%
Buddhism	0.02%
Jainism	0.02%
Others or not stated	0.18%

According to the 2011 Census of India, 81.34% of the population is Hindu, 18.23% Muslim, 0.17% Christian, 0.04% Sikh, 0.02% Buddhist and 0.02% Jain. 0.18% did not state a religion in the census.

== Civic administration ==
=== Municipality ===
Jaynagar Majilpur Municipality covers an area of 5.85 km^{2} (2.26 sq mi). It has jurisdiction over the entire city of Jaynagar Majilpur. The municipality was established on 1 April 1869; 157 years ago. It is divided into 14 administrative wards. According to the 2022 municipal election, it is being controlled by the All India Trinamool Congress.

=== Police station ===
Jaynagar police station covers an area of 438.06 km^{2} (169.14 sq mi). It has jurisdiction over parts of the Jaynagar Majilpur Municipality, and the Jaynagar I and Jaynagar II CD blocks.

=== CD block HQ ===
The headquarters of the Jaynagar I CD block are located at Baharu. The map of the CD block Jaynagar I on the page number 699 in the District Census Handbook 2011 for the South 24 Parganas district shows the headquarters of the CD block as being located in Jaynagar Majilpur.

The headquarters of the Jaynagar II CD block are located at Nimpith. The map of the CD block Jaynagar II on the page number 725 in the District Census Handbook 2011 for the South 24 Parganas district shows the headquarters of the CD block as being located in Jaynagar Majilpur.

== Transport ==
Jaynagar Majilpur is on the State Highway 1.

Jaynagar Majilpur railway station is on the Sealdah–Namkhana line of the Kolkata Suburban Railway.

=== Commuters ===
With the electrification of the railways, suburban traffic has grown tremendously since the 1960s. As of 2005–06, more than 1.7 million (17 lakhs) commuters use the Kolkata Suburban Railway system daily. After the partition of India, refugees from erstwhile East Pakistan and Bangladesh had a strong impact on the development of urban areas in the periphery of Kolkata. The new immigrants depended on Kolkata for their livelihood, thus increasing the number of commuters. Eastern Railway runs 1,272 EMU trains daily.

== Education ==
- Dhruba Chand Halder College, established in 1965, is affiliated with the University of Calcutta. It offers honours courses in Bengali, English, Sanskrit, history, political science, philosophy, economics, geography, education, mathematics and accounting & finance, and general degree courses in arts, science, and commerce.
- Jaynagar Institution is a Bengali-medium school for boys. It was established in 1878 and has facilities for teaching from class V to class XII.
- Jaynagar P. C. Paul Institution is a Bengali-medium school for boys. It was established in 1915 and has facilities for teaching from class V to class XII.
- Jaynagar Institution for Girls is a Bengali-medium school for girls. It was established in 1947 and has facilities for teaching from class V to class XII.
- Jaynagar Chamatkarini Balika Vidyalaya is a Bengali-medium school for girls. It was established in 1941 and has facilities for teaching from class V to class XII.
- Majilpur J. M. Training School is a Bengali-medium school for boys. It was established in 1905 and has facilities for teaching from class V to class XII.
- Majilpur Shyamsundar Balika Vidyalaya is a Bengali-medium school for girls. It was established in 1934 and has facilities for teaching from class V to class XII.
- Majilpur Atul Krishna Vinodini Bhattacharya Vidyapith is a Bengali-medium school for boys. It was established in 1948 and has facilities for teaching from class V to class XII.

== Healthcare ==
Jaynagar Majilpur Maternity Home, with 10 beds, is the major government medical facility in the Jaynagar Majilpur.

== Notable people ==
- Sivanath Shastri, Social reformer, philoshoper and writer
- Kanailal Bhattacharjee, Revolutionary nationalist
- Nilratan Sircar, Doctor
- Jogindranath Sarkar, Writer
- Shakti Chattopadhyay, Writer
- Bimal Krishna Matilal, Philosopher
- Hemant Kumar, Music director, composer, lyricist and playback singer
- Nirmala Mishra, Playback singer
- Subodh Banerjee, Member of Legislative Assembly, Minister for Public Works Department and Minister for Labour
- Paresh Nath Kayal, Member of Parliament
- Sakti Kumar Sarkar, Member of Parliament
- Sanat Kumar Mandal Member of Parliament
- Tarun Mandal, Member of Parliament
- Pratima Mondal, Member of Parliament
- Biswanath Das, Member of Legislative Assembly
