= Tilpi =

- Village
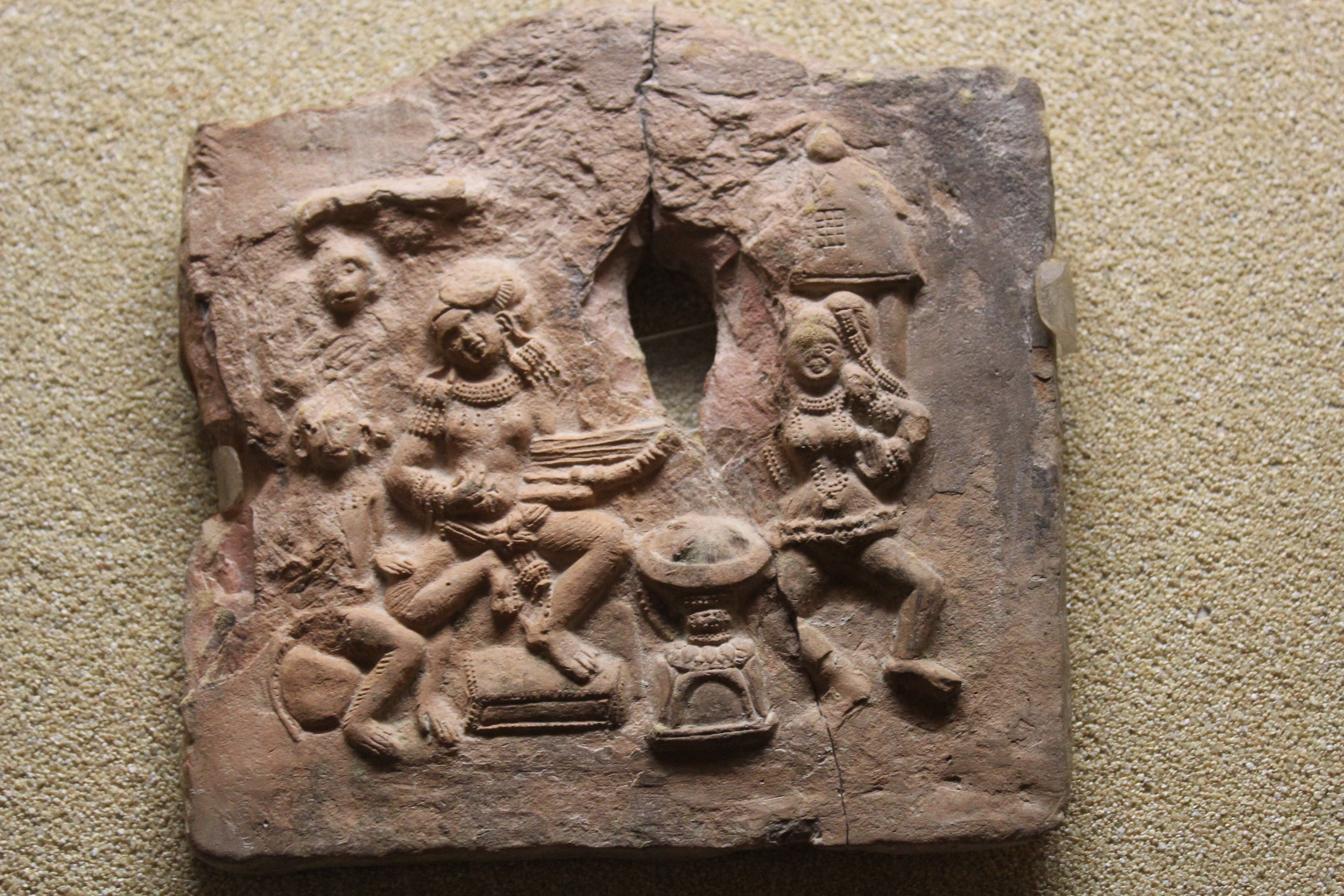
- Terracotta Plaque Found at Dhosa/Tilpi, Now at State Archaeological Museum at Behala

- Location in West Bengal Location in India
- Coordinates: 22.2380°N 88.5614°E
- Country: India
- State: West Bengal
- District: South 24 Parganas
- CD block: Jaynagar I

Area
  - Total: 7.94 km^{2} (3.07 sq mi)
- Elevation: 8 m (26 ft)

Population (2011)
  - Total: 13,350
  - Density: 1,680/km^{2} (4,350/sq mi)

Languages
  - Official: Bengali
  - Additional official: English
- Time zone: UTC+5:30 (IST)
- PIN: 743337
- Telephone code: +91 3218
- Vehicle registration: WB-19 to WB-22, WB-95 to WB-99
- Lok Sabha constituency: Jadavpur
- Vidhan Sabha constituency: Baruipur Purba (SC)
- Website: www.s24pgs.gov.in

Tilpi is a village and an archaeological site within the jurisdiction of the Jaynagar Majilpur police station in the Jaynagar I CD block in the Baruipur subdivision of the South 24 Parganas district in the Indian state of West Bengal.

== History ==
According to the District Census Handbook, this archeological site is located beside the Piyali river. “Here, beside different artefacts, remains of some ancient structures have also been discovered. Sunga style Terracotta artefacts, earthen wares with ornate design, toy carts with animals like elephant, ram, god-like figurines etc. have been excavated. The most notable item of Tilpi is a mould of elephant decorated with flower at the end of the trunk.” It was excavated in 2005–07.

According to Sharmi Chakraborty, Centre for archaeological Studies and Training, Eastern India, the site was excavated by the Directorate of Archaeology and Museums. “ Period I is dated to 2nd/1st century BC E Period III 2nd/3rd century CE.” Among the artefacts recovered were: “terracotta plaques, pottery, uninscribed cast-copper coins, semi-precious stone beads.”

== Geography ==
Cities and towns in the southern part of Baruipur subdivision (including Baruipur, Jaynagar I & II, Kultali CD blocks) in South 24 Parganas district
M: municipal city/ town, CT: census town, R: rural/ urban centre, N: neighbourhood, H: historical place/ religious centre
Places linked with coastal activity are marked in blue
Owing to space constraints in the small map, the actual locations in a larger map may vary slightly

=== Area overview ===
Baruipur subdivision is a rural subdivision with moderate levels of urbanization. 31.05% of the population lives in the urban areas and 68.95% lives in the rural areas. In the southern portion of the subdivision (shown in the map alongside) there are 20 census towns. The entire district is situated in the Ganges Delta and the southern part is covered by the Baruipur-Jaynagar Plain.

Note: The map alongside presents some of the notable locations in the subdivision. All places marked in the map are linked in the larger full screen map.

=== Location ===
Tilpi is located at 22°14′17″N 88°33′41″E. It has an average elevation of 8 metres (26 ft).

== Demographics ==
According to the 2011 Census of India, Tilpi had a total population of 13,350, of which 6,853 (51%) were males and 6,507 (49%) were females. There were 2,635 persons in the age range of 0 to 6 years. The total number of literate persons in Tilpi was 7,011 (65.43% of the population over 6 years).
