= Piyali River =

River in India

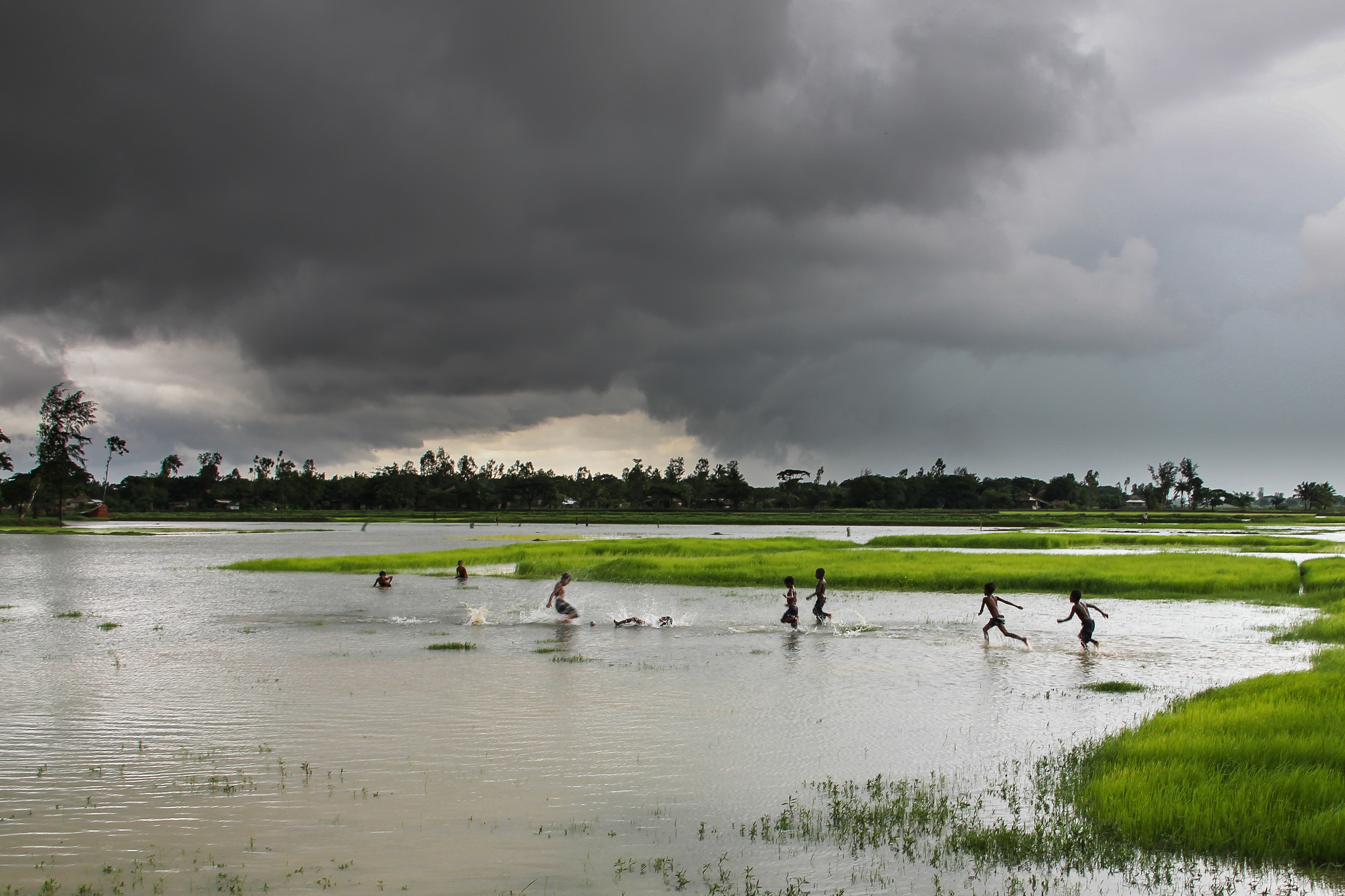
- Local children playing near the bank of the Piyali

Location
- Country: India
- State: West Bengal

Physical characteristics
- Discharge
  - location: Bay of Bengal

Piyali River is a tidal estuarine river in and around the Sundarbans in South 24 Parganas district in the Indian state of West Bengal.

The Piyali leaves the Bidyadhari River 14 kilometres (9 mi) below Bamanghata and flows south and south-west till it joins the Matla River about 32 kilometres (20 mi) below Canning. The Piyali links to the Matla through the Kultala gang which also links to the Thakuran.

The Sundarbans area is intersected by an intricate network of interconnecting waterways, of which the larger channels are often 1.6 kilometres (0.99 mi) or more in width and run in a north-south direction. These waterways now carry little fresh water as they are mostly cut off from the Ganges, the outflow of which has shifted from the Hooghly–Bhagirathi channels progressively eastwards since the 17th century. This is due to subsidence of the Bengal Basin and a gradual eastward tilting of the overlying crust. The Piyali is heavily silted and most of it has been converted to low cultivated land, leaving only a narrow channel.
