= Subhashgram =

Subhasgram
- Neighbourhood
- Location in West Bengal Location in India
- Coordinates: 22.4168°N 88.4348°E
- Country: India
- State: West Bengal
- Division: Presidency
- District: South 24 Parganas
- Region: Greater Kolkata

Government
  - Type: Municipality
  - Body: Rajpur Sonarpur Municipality
- Elevation: 9 m (30 ft)

Languages
  - Official: Bengali
  - Additional official: English
- Time zone: UTC+5:30 (IST)
- PIN: 700146, 700147
- Telephone code: +91 33
- Vehicle registration: WB-19 to WB-22, WB-95 to WB-99
- Lok Sabha constituency: Jadavpur
- Vidhan Sabha constituency: Sonarpur South
- Website: www.rajpursonarpurmunicipality.in

Subhasgram is a neighbourhood in the Rajpur Sonarpur of the South 24 Parganas district in the Indian state of West Bengal. It is a part of the area covered by the Kolkata Metropolitan Development Authority (KMDA).

== History ==
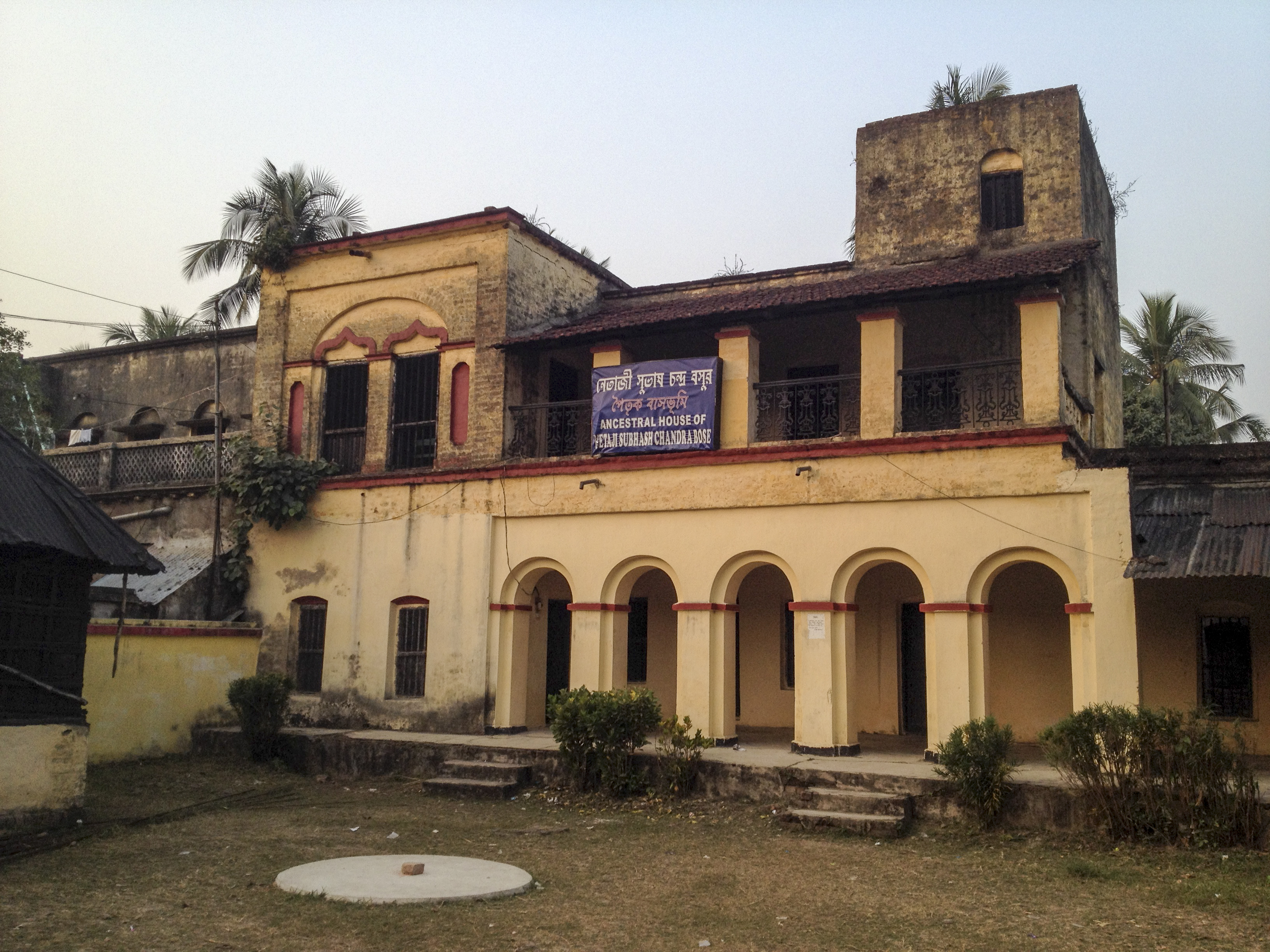
Ancestral house of Netaji Subhash Chandra Bose

Subhasgram has a legacy of rich history starting from the early years of British rule in Bengal. Subhasgram, named in honour of Netaji Subhas Chandra Bose, was earlier known as Changripota. Modern day Subasgram encompasses the localities of Changripota, Kodalia, parts of Harinavi and Chanditala. Subhasgram has been the home of numerous personalities, engaged either in social reform movements during the period of Bengal Renaissance or the Independence movement. Subhasgram houses the ancestral home of Dwarkanath Vidyabhsan and is also the birth place of Ramnarayan Tarkaratna, Shivnath Sastri and M.N. Roy. The ancestral houses of Sarat Chandra Bose and Subhash Chandra Bose are at Kodalia. Both of them were members of the first 24 Parganas District Committee of the Congress Party, which was formed in 1921.

== Geography ==
Cities and towns in the northern part of Baruipur subdivision (including Sonarpur, Bhangar I & II CD blocks) in South 24 Parganas district
M: municipal city/ town, CT: census town, R: rural/ urban centre, N: neighbourhood
Owing to space constraints in the small map, the actual locations in a larger map may vary slightly

=== Area overview ===
Baruipur subdivision is a rural subdivision with moderate levels of urbanization. 31.05% of the population live in the urban areas and 68.95% live in the rural areas. In the northern portion of the subdivision (shown in the map alongside) there are 10 census towns. The entire district is situated in the Ganges Delta and the northern part of the subdivision is a flat plain bordering the metropolis of Kolkata.

Note: The map alongside presents some of the notable locations in the subdivision. All places marked in the map are linked in the larger full screen map.

=== Location ===
Subhashgram is located at 22°25′00″N 88°26′05″E. It has an average elevation of 9 metres (30 ft).

== Transport ==
Subhashgram is on the State Highway 1.

Subhashgram railway station is on the Sealdah–Namkhana line of the Kolkata Suburban Railway system.

=== Commuters ===
With the electrification of the railways, suburban traffic has grown tremendously since the 1960s. As of 2005-06, more than 1.7 million (17 lakhs) commuters use the Kolkata Suburban Railway system daily. After the partition of India, refugees from erstwhile East Pakistan and Bangladesh had a strong impact on the development of urban areas in the periphery of Kolkata. The new immigrants depended on Kolkata for their livelihood, thus increasing the number of commuters. Eastern Railway runs 1,272 EMU trains daily.

== Education ==
Subhashgram Nabatara Vidyalaya Up High School is a Bengali-medium coeducational school. It was established in 1986 and has facilities for teaching from class V to class XII.

- Harinavi DVAS High School

== Healthcare ==
Sonarpur Rural Hospital, with 25 beds, at Rajpur Sonarpur, is the major government medical facility in the Sonarpur CD block.

== Notable people ==
- Janakinath Bose, an Indian lawyer and the father of Indian independence leader Subhas Chandra Bose.
- Sarat Chandra Bose, an Indian barrister and independence activist
- Subhas Chandra Bose, an Indian nationalist
- Sujit Mondal, an Indian filmmaker, screenplay writer
- Sivanath Shastri, a social reformer, writer, translator, scholar, editor philosopher
