= Chak Baria =

- Census Town
- Location in West Bengal Location in India
- Coordinates: 22.4231°N 88.5054°E
- Country: India
- State: West Bengal
- District: South 24 Parganas
- CD block: Sonarpur

Area
  - Total: 1.57 km^{2} (0.61 sq mi)
- Elevation: 9 m (30 ft)

Population (2011)
  - Total: 4,914
  - Density: 3,130/km^{2} (8,110/sq mi)

Languages
  - Official: Bengali
  - Additional official: English
- Time zone: UTC+5:30 (IST)
- PIN: 743330
- Telephone code: +91 33
- Vehicle registration: WB-19 to WB-22, WB-95 to WB-99
- Lok Sabha constituency: Jadavpur
- Vidhan Sabha constituency: Sonarpur Dakshin
- Website: www.s24pgs.gov.in

Chak Baria is a census town within the jurisdiction of the Sonarpur police station in the Sonarpur CD block in the Baruipur subdivision of the South 24 Parganas district in the Indian state of West Bengal.

== Geography ==
Cities and towns in the northern part of Baruipur subdivision (including Sonarpur, Bhangar I & II CD blocks) in South 24 Parganas district
M: municipal city/ town, CT: census town, R: rural/ urban centre, N: neighbourhood
Owing to space constraints in the small map, the actual locations in a larger map may vary slightly

=== Area overview ===
Baruipur subdivision is a rural subdivision with moderate levels of urbanization. 31.05% of the population lives in the urban areas and 68.95% lives in the rural areas. In the northern portion of the subdivision (shown in the map alongside) there are 10 census towns. The entire district is situated in the Ganges Delta and the northern part of the subdivision is a flat plain bordering the metropolis of Kolkata.

Note: The map alongside presents some of the notable locations in the subdivision. All places marked in the map are linked in the larger full screen map.

=== Location ===
Chak Baria is located at 22°25′23″N 88°30′19″E. It has an average elevation of 9 metres (30 ft).

Kalikapur, Chak Baria and Sahebpur form a cluster of census towns in the Sonarpur CD block, as per the map of Sonarpur CD block in the District Census Handbook for the South 24 Parganas.

== Demographics ==
According to the 2011 Census of India, Chak Baria had a total population of 4,914, of which 2,520 (51%) were males and 2,394 (49%) were females. There were 634 persons in the age range of 0 to 6 years. The total number of literate persons in Chak Baria was 3,440 (80.37% of the population over 6 years).

== Infrastructure ==
According to the District Census Handbook 2011, Chak Baria covered an area of 1.5729 km^{2}. Among the civic amenities, it had 10 km roads with open drains, the protected water supply involved borewell and service reservoir. It had 150 domestic electric connections. Among the medical facilities it had 1 family welfare entre and 1 veterinary hospital 1 km away. Among the educational facilities it had were 2 primary schools, 1 secondary school, 1 senior secondary school. It had the branch office of 1 non-agricultural credit society.

== Social scenario ==
People living in this part of rural Bengal, particularly the Muslims and those belonging to the scheduled castes, are the most backward educationally, as well as in socio-economic terms.

== Transport ==
Sonarpur-Chak Baria Road links Chak Baria to the State Highway 1.

Kalikapur railway station is located nearby.

== Education ==
Sishubikash College of Education, at Chakberia-Mokrampur More, is a minority institution conducted by the Society for Islamic Education. It offers a 2-years B Ed course.

Sishubikash Academy is a private unaided Bengali-medium coeducational institution established in 1985. It has facilities for teaching from class I to class XII. It has a library with 5,000 books and 20 computers.

== Healthcare ==
Sonarpur Rural Hospital, with 25 beds, at Rajpur Sonarpur, is the major government medical facility in the Sonarpur CD block.
