= Sahebpur =

- Census Town
- Location in West Bengal Location in India
- Coordinates: 22.4117°N 88.4925°E
- Country: India
- State: West Bengal
- District: South 24 Parganas
- CD block: Sonarpur

Area
  - Total: 2.06 km^{2} (0.80 sq mi)
- Elevation: 9 m (30 ft)

Population (2011)
  - Total: 7,109
  - Density: 3,450/km^{2} (8,940/sq mi)

Languages
  - Official: Bengali
  - Additional official: English
- Time zone: UTC+5:30 (IST)
- PIN: 743330
- Telephone code: +91 33
- Vehicle registration: WB-19 to WB-22, WB-95 to WB-99
- Lok Sabha constituency: Jadavpur
- Vidhan Sabha constituency: Sonarpur Dakshin
- Website: www.s24pgs.gov.in

Sahebpur is a census town within the jurisdiction of the Sonarpur police station in the Sonarpur CD block in the Baruipur subdivision of the South 24 Parganas district in the Indian state of West Bengal.

== Geography ==
Cities and towns in the northern part of Baruipur subdivision (including Sonarpur, Bhangar I & II CD blocks) in South 24 Parganas district
M: municipal city/ town, CT: census town, R: rural/ urban centre, N: neighbourhood
Owing to space constraints in the small map, the actual locations in a larger map may vary slightly

=== Area overview ===
Baruipur subdivision is a rural subdivision with moderate levels of urbanization. 31.05% of the population lives in the urban areas and 68.95% lives in the rural areas. In the northern portion of the subdivision (shown in the map alongside) there are 10 census towns. The entire district is situated in the Ganges Delta and the northern part of the subdivision is a flat plain bordering the metropolis of Kolkata.

Note: The map alongside presents some of the notable locations in the subdivision. All places marked in the map are linked in the larger full screen map.

=== Location ===
Sahebpur is located at 22°24′42″N 88°29′33″E. It has an average elevation of 9 metres (30 ft).

Kalikapur, Chak Baria and Sahebpur form a cluster of census towns in the Sonarpur CD block, as per the map of Sonarpur CD block in the District Census Handbook for the South 24 Parganas.

== Demographics ==
According to the 2011 Census of India, Sahebpur had a total population of 7,109, of which 3,642 (51%) were males and 3,467 (49%) were females. There were 636 persons in the age range of 0 to 6 years. The total number of literate people in Sahebpur was 4,419 (79.47% of the population over 6 years).

== Infrastructure ==
According to the District Census Handbook 2011, Sahebpur covered an area of 2.0573 km^{2}. Kalikapur railway station is 2 km away. Among the civic amenities, the protected water supply involved overhead tank and service reservoir. It had 698 domestic electric connections. Among the educational facilities it had were 2 primary schools, the nearest middle school and the nearest secondary school at Jafarpur 1 km away, the nearest senior secondary school at Kalikapur 2 km away, the nearest general degree college at Ghoshpara, Sonarpur 3 km away. Among the important commodities it produced were tube light and lamp. It had the branch office of 1 nationalised bank.

== Transport ==
A short stretch of local roads link Sahebpur to the Sonarpur-Chak Baria Road.

Kalikapur railway station is located nearby.

== Education ==
Jafarpur Kalinath High School is a Bengali-medium coeducational school established in 1968. It has facilities for teaching from class 5 to class XII.

== Healthcare ==
Sonarpur Rural Hospital, with 25 beds, at Rajpur Sonarpur, is the major government medical facility in the Sonarpur CD block.
