= Narendrapur =

- Neighbourhood
- Location in West Bengal Location in India
- Coordinates: 22.4391°N 88.3968°E
- Country: India
- State: West Bengal
- Division: Presidency
- District: South 24 Parganas
- City: Kolkata
- Region: Greater Kolkata

Government
  - Type: Municipality
  - Body: Rajpur Sonarpur Municipality
- Elevation: 9 m (30 ft)

Languages
  - Official: Bengali
  - Additional official: English
- Time zone: UTC+5:30 (IST)
- PIN: 700103
- Telephone code: +91 33
- Vehicle registration: WB-19 to WB-22, WB-95 to WB-99
- Lok Sabha constituency: Jadavpur
- Vidhan Sabha constituency: Sonarpur Uttar
- Website: www.rajpursonarpurmunicipality.in

Narendrapur is a locality in Rajpur Sonarpur of South 24 Parganas district in the Indian state of West Bengal. It is a part of the area covered by the Kolkata Metropolitan Development Authority (KMDA).

== Geography ==
Cities and towns in the northern part of Baruipur subdivision (including Sonarpur, Bhangar I & II CD blocks) in South 24 Parganas district
M: municipal city/ town, CT: census town, R: rural/ urban centre, N: neighbourhood
Owing to space constraints in the small map, the actual locations in a larger map may vary slightly

=== Area overview ===
Baruipur subdivision is a rural subdivision with moderate levels of urbanization. 31.05% of the population lives in the urban areas and 68.95% lives in the rural areas. In the northern portion of the subdivision (shown in the map alongside) there are 10 census towns. The entire district is situated in the Ganges Delta and the northern part of the subdivision is a flat plain bordering the metropolis of Kolkata.

Note: The map alongside presents some of the notable locations in the subdivision. All places marked in the map are linked in the larger full screen map.

=== Location ===
Narendrapur is located at 22°26′21″N 88°23′48″E. It has an average elevation of 9 metres (30 ft).

== Transport ==
Narendrapur is on the State Highway 1.

Narendrapur railway station is on the Sealdah–Namkhana line of the Kolkata Suburban Railway system.

=== Commuters ===
With the electrification of the railways, suburban traffic has grown tremendously since the 1960s. As of 2005-06, more than 1.7 million (17 lakhs) commuters use the Kolkata Suburban Railway system daily. After the partition of India, refugees from erstwhile East Pakistan and Bangladesh had a strong impact on the development of urban areas in the periphery of Kolkata. The new immigrants depended on Kolkata for their livelihood, thus increasing the number of commuters. Eastern Railway runs 1,272 EMU trains daily.

== Education ==
Narendrapur Ramakrishna Mission Residential College, established in 1960, is affiliated with the University of Calcutta. It offers honours courses in Bengali, English, Sanskrit, history, political science, philosophy, economics, geography, education, mathematics and accounting & finance, and general degree courses in arts, science, and commerce.

Narendrapur Ramakrishna Mission Blind Boys Academy, established in 1965, is affiliated with the University of Calcutta and is recognised by the Rehabilitation Council of India. It specialises in education/ teacher education. It has a hostel, a computer centre and a playground.

Narendrapur Ramakrishna Mission Vidyalaya is a Bengali-medium school for boys. It was established in 1958 and has facilities for teaching from class V to class XII.

Ramakrishna Mission Industrial Training Centre is a government sponsored vocational training institute, founded in 1967, It is affiliated with the Directorate General of Employment and Training, New Delhi and West Bengal State Council of Vocational Education and Training. It provides skill based and technical education to rural and economically underpriviledged youths.

== Healthcare ==
Sonarpur Rural Hospital, with 25 beds, at Rajpur Sonarpur, is the major government medical facility in the Sonarpur CD block.
