= Danga, Sonarpur =

Danga
- Census Town
- Location in West Bengal Location in India
- Coordinates: 22.4330°N 88.3601°E
- Country: India
- State: West Bengal
- District: South 24 Parganas
- CD block: Sonarpur

Area
  - Total: 1.83 km^{2} (0.71 sq mi)
- Elevation: 9 m (30 ft)

Population (2011)
  - Total: 6,766
  - Density: 3,700/km^{2} (9,580/sq mi)

Languages
  - Official: Bengali
  - Additional official: English
- Time zone: UTC+5:30 (IST)
- PIN: 700154
- Telephone code: +91 33
- Vehicle registration: WB-19 to WB-22, WB-95 to WB-99
- Lok Sabha constituency: Jadavpur
- Vidhan Sabha constituency: Sonarpur Uttar
- Website: www.s24pgs.gov.in

Danga is a census town within the jurisdiction of the Sonarpur police station in the Sonarpur CD block in the Baruipur subdivision of the South 24 Parganas district in the Indian state of West Bengal.

== Geography ==
Cities and towns in the northern part of Baruipur subdivision (including Sonarpur, Bhangar I & II CD blocks) in South 24 Parganas district
M: municipal city/ town, CT: census town, R: rural/ urban centre, N: neighbourhood
Owing to space constraints in the small map, the actual locations in a larger map may vary slightly

=== Area overview ===
Baruipur subdivision is a rural subdivision with moderate levels of urbanization. 31.05% of the population lives in the urban areas and 68.95% lives in the rural areas. In the northern portion of the subdivision (shown in the map alongside) there are 10 census towns. The entire district is situated in the Ganges Delta and the northern part of the subdivision is a flat plain bordering the metropolis of Kolkata.

Note: The map alongside presents some of the notable locations in the subdivision. All places marked in the map are linked in the larger full screen map.

=== Location ===
Danga is located at 22°25′59″N 88°21′36″E. It has an average elevation of 9 metres (30 ft).

Danga and Ramchandrapur are adjacent to Rajpur Sonarpur city on its south-eastern side, as per the map of the Sonarpur CD block in the District Census Handbook for the South 24 Parganas.

== Demographics ==
According to the 2011 Census of India, Danga had a total population of 6,766, of which 3,503 (52%) were males and 3,263 (48%) were females. There were 628 persons in the age range of 0 to 6 years. The total number of literate persons in Danga was 5,026 (81.88% of the population over 6 years).

== Infrastructure ==
According to the District Census Handbook 2011, Danga covered an area of 1.8315 km^{2}. Sonarpur Junction railway station is 8 km away. Among the civic amenities, it had 10 km roads with open drains, the protected water supply involved service reservoir. It had 1,050 domestic electric connections. Among the medical facilities it had 1 dispensary/ health centre 1 km away. Among the educational facilities it had were 2 primary schools, 1 middle school, 1 secondary school and 1 senior secondary school.

== Transport ==
A short stretch of local roads link Danga to the State Highway 1.

Sonarpur Junction railway station is located nearby.

== Education ==
Danga High Madrasah is a high school.

== Healthcare ==
Sonarpur Rural Hospital, with 25 beds, at Rajpur Sonarpur, is the major government medical facility in the Sonarpur CD block.
