= Panchghara, Baruipur =

Panchghara
- Census Town
- Location in West Bengal Location in India
- Coordinates: 22.4083°N 88.4489°E
- Country: India
- State: West Bengal
- District: South 24 Parganas
- CD block: Baruipur

Area
  - Total: 1.33 km^{2} (0.51 sq mi)
- Elevation: 9 m (30 ft)

Population (2011)
  - Total: 6,340
  - Density: 4,770/km^{2} (12,300/sq mi)

Languages
  - Official: Bengali
  - Additional official: English
- Time zone: UTC+5:30 (IST)
- PIN: 700147
- Telephone code: +91 33
- Vehicle registration: WB-19 to WB-22, WB-95 to WB-99
- Lok Sabha constituency: Jadavpur
- Vidhan Sabha constituency: Baruipur Paschim
- Website: www.s24pgs.gov.in

Panchghara is a census town within the jurisdiction of the Baruipur police station in the Baruipur CD block in the Baruipur subdivision of the South 24 Parganas district in the Indian state of West Bengal.

== Geography ==
Cities and towns in the southern part of Baruipur subdivision
M: municipal city/ town, CT: census town, N: neighbourhood
Owing to space constraints in the small map, the actual locations in a larger map may vary slightly

=== Area overview ===
Baruipur subdivision is a rural subdivision with moderate levels of urbanization. 31.05% of the population lives in the urban areas and 68.95% lives in the rural areas. In the southern portion of the subdivision (shown in the map alongside) there are 20 census towns. The entire district is situated in the Ganges Delta and the southern part is covered by the Baruipur-Jaynagar Plain. Archaeological excavations at Dhosa and Tilpi, on the bank of the Piyali River, indicate the existence of human habitation around 2,000 years ago.

Note: The map alongside presents some of the notable locations in the subdivision. All places marked in the map are linked in the larger full screen map.

=== Location ===
Panchghara is located at 22°24′30″N 88°26′56″E. It has an average elevation of 9 metres (30 ft).

Petua, Panchghara, Mallikpur and Hariharpur form a cluster of census towns in the Baruipur CD block, as per the map of the Baruipur CD block in the District Census Handbook for the South 24 Parganas. This cluster has Rajpur Sonarpur on the east and Bidyadharpur on the north, both in the Sonarpur CD block, as per the map of the Sonarpur CD block in the District Census Handbook for the South 24 Parganas.

== Demographics ==
According to the 2011 Census of India, Panchghara had a total population of 6,340, of which 3,230 (51%) were males and 3,110 (49%) were females. There were 825 persons in the age range of 0 to 6 years. The total number of literate persons in Panchghara was 3,964 (72.23% of the population over 6 years).

== Infrastructure ==
According to the District Census Handbook 2011, Panchghara covered an area of 1.3336 km^{2}. Among the civic amenities, it had 8 km roads with open drains; the protected water supply involved tap water from treated and untreated sources. It had 2,470 domestic electric connections and 50 road light points. Among the medical facilities it had dispensary/ health centre 1 km away, family welfare centre 1 km away, maternity and child welfare centre 1 km away and 15 medicine shops in the town. Among the educational facilities it had were 3 primary schools.

== Transport ==
Subhashgram-Champahati Road links Panchghara to the State Highway 1.

Subhashgram railway station is located nearby.

== Healthcare ==
Hariharpur Block Primary Health Centre, with 10 beds, at Hariharpur (PO Mallikpur), is the major government medical facility in the Baruipur CD block.
