= Suvendra Nath Bhattacharyya =

Indian molecular biologist and epigeneticist

- Born: 4 October 1975 (age 50); Harinavi, West Bengal, India
- Education: Harinavi DVAS High School; Ballygunge Campus; Calcutta University; Jadavpur University; Indian Institute of Chemical Biology; Friedrich Miescher Institute
- Known for: Studies on Leishmaniasis
- Awards: 2004 AAAS-GE Healthcare Young Scientist Award; 2004 INSA Young Scientist Award; 2008 IHFSPO Career Development Award; 2015 N-BIOS Prize; 2015 NASI-Scopus Young Scientist Award; 2016 Shanti Swarup Bhatnagar Prize; 2016 Prof. B. K. Bachhawat Memorial Travel Award
- Scientific career
- Fields: Molecular biology; Epigenetics
- Workplaces: Indian Institute of Chemical Biology

Suvendra Nath Bhattacharyya (born 4 October 1975) is an Indian molecular biologist, epigeneticist and the principal scientist at the Indian Institute of Chemical Biology of the Council of Scientific and Industrial Research. He is a recipient of the Swarnajayanthi Fellowship of the Department of Science and Technology and the National Bioscience Award of the Department of Biotechnology. The Council of Scientific and Industrial Research, the apex agency of the Government of India for scientific research, awarded him the Shanti Swarup Bhatnagar Prize for Science and Technology, one of the highest Indian science awards, in 2016, for his contributions to biological sciences.

== Biography ==
Suvendra Nath Bhattacharyya, born on 4 October 1975 in the Indian state of West Bengal, did his early schooling at Harinavi DVAS High School. He completed his M.Sc. from Ballygunge Campus of Calcutta University. After securing a PhD from Jadavpur University, he joined the Indian Institute of Chemical Biology (IICB) as a research fellow in 1998 and on completion of the fellowship in 2003, he moved to Friedrich Miescher Institute where he did his post-doctoral studies from 2004 to 2008 on a Human Frontier Science Program fellowship. Returning to India the same year, he joined IICB as a scientist at the Molecular and Human Genetics Division. He heads the RNA Biology Research Laboratory (RBRL, popularly known as Bhattacharyya Lab) of the institute where serves as the principal investigator and hosts a number of research scholars.

== Legacy ==
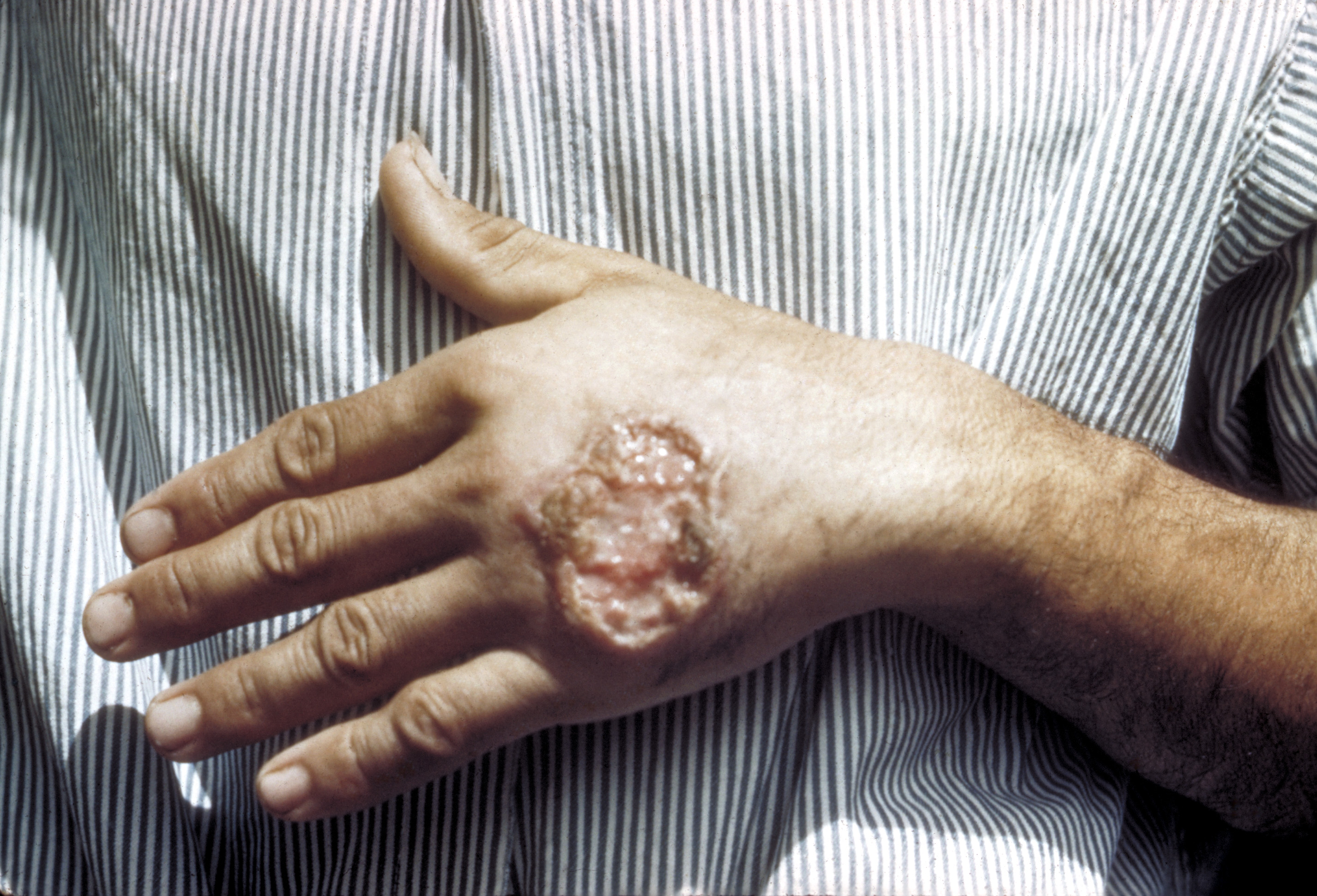
Skin ulcer due to leishmaniasis.

Bhattacharyya's researches at RBRL is mainly on microRNA (miRNA), focusing on its compartmentalization, regulation and mediation as well as its alteration in Leishmania invaded macrophage and neighboring non-macrophage cells. His researches assisted in identifying cholesterol as a modulator in leishmaniasis infection and his team has developed a therapeutic protocol for treating leishmaniasis by administering microRNA molecules in patients which has been found to raise the cholesterol level which in turn reduced the parasite levels. The treatment, combined with other drugs have been reported to be effective in treating the disease commonly known as Kala azar, which has a reported high drug resistance. One of his earlier projects, Mechanism of mRNA compartmentalization in the cytoplasm of mammalian cells, was funded by the Wellcome Trust. On his current project, miRNA expoprt and Stability, he has worked on the mammalian immune and cancer cells and reportedly discovered miRNA activity modulation mechanisms in those cells.

At his laboratory, Bhattacharyya mentors many post-doctoral and doctoral researchers. He has published several articles in peer-reviewed journals and the online knowledge repositories which have listed his articles include ResearchGate, Google Scholar, and PubMed. He is a member of the Neurobiology Task force of the Department of Biotechnology and was a member of Local Organizing Committee of the APSN-ISN Neuroscience School held in January 2014. He has delivered several featured talks and has assisted others in their researches.

== Awards and honors ==
Suvendra Bhattacharyya received the Young Scientist Award of the AAAS-GE Healthcare in 2004. He also received the Young Scientist Award of the Indian National Science Academy the same year. The Human Frontier Science Program Organization awarded him the Career Development Award and he was selected for the Swarnajayanthi Fellowship of the Department of Science and Technology, both the honors reaching him in 2008. He received the National Bioscience Award for Career Development of the Department of Biotechnology and the NASI-Scopus Young Scientist Award of the Elsevier and National Academy of Sciences, India in 2015. The Council of Scientific and Industrial Research awarded Bhattacharyya, a recipient of the 2016 Prof. B. K. Bachhawat Memorial Travel Award, the Shanti Swarup Bhatnagar Prize, one of the highest Indian science awards, in 2016. He was one among the 12 Young Achievers of Modern India and featured in the 2016 Calendar of the Shoolini University. In 2017, Bhattacharyya became a laureate of the Asian Scientist 100 by the Asian Scientist.

== Selected bibliography ==
- Sudarshana Basu; Suvendra N Bhattacharyya (May 2014). "Insulin-like growth factor-1 prevents miR-122 production in neighbouring cells to curtail its intercellular transfer to ensure proliferation of human hepatoma cells". Nucleic Acids Research. 42 (11): 7170–7185. doi:10.1093/nar/gku346. PMC 4066773. PMID 24813441.
- June Ghosh; Mainak Bose; Syamal Roy; Suvendra N Bhattacharyya (March 2013). "Leishmania donovani targets Dicer1 to downregulate miR-122, lower serum cholesterol, and facilitate murine liver infection". Cell Host & Microbe. 13 (3): 277–288. doi:10.1016/j.chom.2013.02.005. PMC 3605572. PMID 23498953.
- Nicolas Cougot; Suvendra N Bhattacharyya; Lucie Tapia-Arancibia; Remy Bordonné; Witold Filipowicz; Edouard Bertrand; Florence Rage (December 2008). "Dendrites of mammalian neurons contain specialized P-body-like structures that respond to neuronal activation". The Journal of Neuroscience. 28 (51): 13793–13804. doi:10.1523/JNEUROSCI.4155-08.2008. PMC 6671906. PMID 19091970.
- Witold Filipowicz; Suvendra N Bhattacharyya; Nahum Sonenberg (February 2008). "Mechanisms of post-transcriptional regulation by microRNAs: are the answers in sight?". Nature Reviews Genetics. 9 (2): 102–114. doi:10.1038/nrg2290. PMID 18197166. S2CID 11824239.
- Ramesh S Pillai; Suvendra N Bhattacharyya; Witold Filipowicz (March 2007). "Repression of protein synthesis by miRNAs: how many mechanisms?". Trends in Cell Biology. 17 (3): 118–126. doi:10.1016/j.tcb.2006.12.007. PMID 17197185.
- Kotaja, Noora; Bhattacharyya, Suvendra N; Jaskiewicz, Lucasz; Kimmins, Sarah; Parvinen, Martti; Filipowicz, Witold; Sassone-Corsi, Paolo (February 2006). "The chromatoid body of male germ cells: similarity with processing bodies and presence of Dicer and microRNA pathway components". Proceedings of the National Academy of Sciences of the United States of America. 103 (8): 2647–2652. Bibcode:2006PNAS..103.2647K. doi:10.1073/pnas.0509333103. PMC 1413789. PMID 16477042.
- SN Bhattacharyya; R Habermacher; U Martine; EI Closs; W Filipowicz (January 2006). "Stress-induced reversal of microRNA repression and mRNA P-body localization in human cells". Cold Spring Harbor Symposia on Quantitative Biology. 71: 513–521. doi:10.1101/sqb.2006.71.038. PMID 17381334.

== See also ==
- microRNA
- Leishmaniasis
