= Kalikapur, Sonarpur =

Kalikapur
- Census Town
- Location in West Bengal Location in India
- Coordinates: 22.4252°N 88.4961°E
- Country: India
- State: West Bengal
- District: South 24 Parganas
- CD block: Sonarpur

Area
  - Total: 2.64 km^{2} (1.02 sq mi)
- Elevation: 9 m (30 ft)

Population (2011)
  - Total: 5,860
  - Density: 2,220/km^{2} (5,750/sq mi)

Languages
  - Official: Bengali
  - Additional official: English
- Time zone: UTC+5:30 (IST)
- PIN: 743330
- Telephone code: +91 33
- Vehicle registration: WB-19 to WB-22, WB-95 to WB-99
- Lok Sabha constituency: Jadavpur
- Vidhan Sabha constituency: Sonarpur Dakshin
- Website: www.s24pgs.gov.in

Kalikapur is a census town and a gram panchayat in the Sonarpur CD block in the Baruipur subdivision of the South 24 Parganas district in the Indian state of West Bengal.

== Geography ==
Cities and towns in the northern part of Baruipur subdivision (including Sonarpur, Bhangar I & II CD blocks) in South 24 Parganas district
M: municipal city/ town, CT: census town, R: rural/ urban centre, N: neighbourhood
Owing to space constraints in the small map, the actual locations in a larger map may vary slightly

=== Area overview ===
Baruipur subdivision is a rural subdivision with moderate levels of urbanization. 31.05% of the population lives in the urban areas and 68.95% lives in the rural areas. In the northern portion of the subdivision (shown in the map alongside) there are 10 census towns. The entire district is situated in the Ganges Delta and the northern part of the subdivision is a flat plain bordering the metropolis of Kolkata.

Note: The map alongside presents some of the notable locations in the subdivision. All places marked in the map are linked in the larger full screen map.

=== Location ===
Kalikapur is located at 22.4252°N 88.4961°E. It has an average elevation of 9 metres (30 ft).

Kalikapur, Chak Baria and Sahebpur form a cluster of census towns in the Sonarpur CD block, as per the map of the Sonarpur CD block in the District Census Handbook for the South 24 Parganas.

== Demographics ==
According to the 2011 Census of India, Kalikapur had a total population of 5,860, of which 2,977 (51%) were males and 2,883 (49%) were females. There were 548 persons in the age range of 0 to 6 years. The total number of literate persons in Kalikapur was 4,419 (83.19% of the population over 6 years).

== Infrastructure ==
According to the District Census Handbook 2011, Kalikapur covered an area of 2.6373 km^{2}. Among the physical aspects, Kalikapur railway station is in the town. Among the civic amenities, it had 10 km roads with open drains, the protected water supply involved borewell and service reservoir. It had 200 domestic electric connections. Among the medical facilities it had 1 nursing home 3 km away, 1 veterinary hospital 1 km away and 3 medicine shops in the town. Among the educational facilities it had were 1 primary school, 2 secondary schools, 2 senior secondary schools, the nearest general degree college at Sonarpur 5 km away. It had 1 engineering college and 1 management institute/ college. Among the social, recreational and cultural facilities it had a public library. Among the commodities it produced were rice and vegetables. It had the branch office of 1 cooperative bank.

== Transport ==
Sonarpur-Chak Baria Road links Kalikapur to the State Highway 1.

Kalikapur railway station is on the Sealdah–Canning line of the Kolkata Suburban Railway system.

=== Commuters ===
With the electrification of the railways, suburban traffic has grown tremendously since the 1960s. As of 2005-06, more than 1.7 million (17 lakhs) commuters use the Kolkata Suburban Railway system daily. After the partition of India, refugees from East Pakistan/Bangladesh had a strong impact on the development of urban areas in the periphery of Kolkata. The new immigrants depended on Kolkata for their livelihood, thus increasing the number of commuters. Eastern Railway runs 1,272 EMU trains daily.

== Education ==
Jyotirmoy School of Education is a coeducational B Ed college.

Jafarpur Kalinath High School is a Bengali-medium coeducational school established in 1968. It has facilities for teaching from class 5 to class XII.

Kalikapur Basanti Devi Balika Vidyalaya is a girls school.

== Healthcare ==
There is a primary health centre, with 10 beds, at Kalikapur.
