= Sonarpur (community development block) =

Community Development Block in West Bengal, India

- Community Development Block
- Location of Sonarpur community development block in South 24 Parganas district
- Coordinates: 22.4382026°N 88.4320450°E
- Country: India
- State: West Bengal
- Division: Presidency
- District: South 24 Parganas
- Subdivision: Baruipur
- Headquarters: Rajpur

Government
  - Gram Panchayats: Banhooghly-I, Banhooghly-II, Kalikapur-I, Kalikapur-II, Kamrabad, Kheyadaha-I, Kheyadaha-II, Langalberia, Poleghat, Pratapnagar, Sonarpur-II
  - Lok Sabha constituencies: Jadavpur
  - Vidhan Sabha constituencies: Sonarpur Dakshin, Sonarpur Uttar

Area
  - Total: 120.63 km^{2} (46.58 sq mi)

Population (2011)
  - Total: 219,863
  - Density: 1,822.6/km^{2} (4,720.6/sq mi)
  - Urban: 44,150

Demographics
  - Literacy: 79.66 per cent
  - Sex ratio: 959 ♂/♀

Languages
  - Official: Bengali
  - Additional official: English
- Time zone: UTC+05:30 (IST)
- Website: s24pgs.gov.in

Sonarpur is a community development block that forms an administrative division in Baruipur subdivision of South 24 Parganas district in the Indian state of West Bengal.

== Geography ==

The Sonarpur CD block is located at 22°26′18″N 88°25′55″E. It has an average elevation of 9 metres (30 ft).

The Sonarpur CD block is bounded by the Kolkata district in the north, the Bhangar I, Bhangar II and Canning II CD blocks in the east, the Baruipur CD block in the south, and the Bishnupur I CD blocks in the west.

The South 24 Parganas district is divided into two distinct physiographic zones: the marine-riverine delta in the north and the marine delta zone in the south. As the sea receded southwards, in the sub-recent geological period, a large low-lying plain got exposed. Both tidal inflows and rivers have deposited sediments in this plain. The periodical collapse of both the natural Levees and man-made embankments speed up the process of filling up of the depressions containing brackish water wetlands. The marine delta in the south is formed of interlacing tidal channels. As non-saline water for irrigation is scarce, agriculture is monsoon-dominated. Some parts of the wetlands are still preserved for raising fish.

The Sonarpur CD block has an area of 120.63 km^{2}. It has 1 panchayat samity, 11 gram panchayats, 156 gram sansads (village councils), 75 mouzas and 65 inhabited villages, as per the District Statistical Handbook, South Twenty-four Parganas. Sonarpur and Narendrapur police stations serve this CD Block. Headquarters of this CD block is at Rajpur.

Gram panchayats of Sonarpur CD block/panchayat samiti are: Banhooghly-I, Banhooghly-II, Kalikapur-I, Kalikapur-II, Kamrabad, Kheyadaha-I, Kheyadaha-II, Langalberia, Poleghat, Pratapnagar and Sonarpur-II.

== Demographics ==
=== Population ===
According to the 2011 Census of India, Sonarpur CD block had a total population of 219,863, of which 175,713 were rural and 44,150 were urban. There were 112,238 (51%) males and 107,625 (49%) females. There were 22,880 persons in the age range of 0 to 6 years. The Scheduled Castes numbered 116,950 (53.19%) and the Scheduled Tribes numbered 3,069 (1.40%).

According to the 2001 Census of India, the Sonarpur CD block had a total population of 167,348, out of which 86,012 were males and 81,336 were females. The Sonarpur CD block registered a population growth of -41.56% during the 1991-2001 decade. Decadal growth for the South 24 Parganas district was 20.89%. Decadal growth in West Bengal was 17.84%. The Scheduled Castes at 99,567 formed more than one-half the population. The Scheduled Tribes numbered 4,348.

Census Towns in the Sonarpur CD block (2011 census figures in brackets): Radhanagar (6,675), Danga (6,766), Ramchandrapur (8,196), Bidyadharpur (4,630), Kalikapur (5,860), Chak Baria (4,914) and Sahebpur (7,109).

Large villages (with 4,000+ population) in the Sonarpur CD block (2011 census figures in brackets): Atghara (4,284), Ranabhutia (4,196), Bhagabanpur (11,177), Tardaha (4,706), Khurigochhi (6,023), Mali Puuria (5,858), Bhabanipur (4,007), Mathurapur (4,460), Joykrishnapur Chairi (6,436), Banhugli (11,103), Baruli (4,152) and Raypur (4,098).

Other villages in the Sonarpur CD block include (2011 census figures in brackets): Paighat (2,360), Pratapnagar (2,785) and Langalber (2,058).

=== Literacy ===
As per the 2011 census, the total number of literates in the Sonarpur CD block was 156,911 (79.66% of the population over 6 years) out of which males numbered 86,132 (85.62% of the male population over 6 years) and females numbered 70,779 (73.43% of the female population over 6 years). The gender disparity (the difference between female and male literacy rates) was 12.19%.

In the South 24 Parganas district, literacy was 77.51%. Literacy in West Bengal was 77.08% in 2011. Overall literacy in India in 2011 was 74.04%.

In the 2001 Census of India, the Sonarpur CD block had a total literacy of 70.74% for the 6+ age group. While male literacy was 79.87%, female literacy was only 61.07%. The South 24 Parganas district had a total literacy rate of 69.45%, male literacy being 79.19% and female literacy being 59.01%.

See also – List of West Bengal districts ranked by literacy rate

Literacy in CD blocks of
South 24 Parganas district
Alipore Sadar subdivision
Bishnupur I – 78.33%
Bishnupur II – 81.37%
Budge Budge I – 80.57%
Budge Budge II – 79.13%
Thakurpukur Maheshtala – 83.54%
Baruipur subdivision
Baruipur – 76.46%
Bhangar I – 72.06%
Bhangar II – 74.49%
Jaynagar I – 73.17%
Jaynagar II – 69.71%
Kultali – 69.37%
Sonarpur – 79.70%
Canning subdivision
Basanti – 68.32%
Canning I – 70.76%
Canning II – 66.51%
Gosaba – 78.98%
Diamond Harbour subdivision
Diamond Harbour I – 75.72%
Diamond Harbour II – 76.91%
Falta – 77.17%
Kulpi – 75.49%
Magrahat I – 73.82%
Magrahat II – 77.41%
Mandirbazar – 75.89%
Mathurapur I – 73.93%
Mathurapur II – 77.77%
Kakdwip subdivision
Kakdwip – 77.93%
Namkhana – 85.72
Patharpratima – 82.11%
Sagar – 84.21%
Source: 2011 Census: CD Block Wise
Primary Census Abstract Data

=== Language ===
Languages of Sonarpur CD block (2011)
1. Bengali (96.7%)
2. Hindi (2.96%)
3. Urdu (0.35%)
4. Others (0.01%)

At the time of the 2011 census, 96.68% of the population spoke Bengali, 2.96% Hindi and 0.35% Urdu as their first language.

=== Religion ===
Religion in Sonarpur CD block (2011)
Hinduism	81.49%
Islam	15.92%
Christianity	1.62%
Other or not stated	0.97%

In the 2011 Census of India, Hindus numbered 179,174 and formed 81.49% of the population in the Sonarpur CD block. Muslims numbered 34,989 and formed 15.92% of the population. Others numbered 5,700 and formed 2.59% of the population. Amongst the others, Christians numbered 3,562. In 2001, Hindus were 80.26% of the population, while Muslims and Christians were 17.69% and 1.81% of the population respectively.

The proportion of Hindus in the South Twenty-four Parganas district has declined from 76.0% in 1961 to 63.2% in 2011. The proportion of Muslims in the South Twenty-four Parganas district has increased from 23.4% to 35.6% during the same period. Christians formed 0.8% in 2011.

== Rural poverty ==
As per the Human Development Report for the South 24 Parganas district, published in 2009, in the Sonarpur CD block the percentage of households below poverty line was 23.36%, a moderate level of poverty, second highest in the north-west portion of the district after the Budge Budge II CD block. According to the rural household survey in 2005, the proportion of households in the South 24 Parganas with poverty rates below poverty line was 34.11%, way above the state and national poverty ratios. The poverty rates were very high in the Sundarbans settlements with all the thirteen CD blocks registering poverty ratios above 30% and eight CD blocks had more than 40% of the population in the BPL category.

== Economy ==
=== Livelihood ===
Livelihood
in Sonarpur CD block
1. Cultivators (10.8%)
2. Agricultural labourers (13.2%)
3. Household industries (3.86%)
4. Other Workers (72.1%)

In the Sonarpur CD block in 2011, amongst the class of total workers, cultivators numbered 8,839 and formed 10.76%, agricultural labourers numbered 10,869 and formed 13.23%, household industry workers numbered 3,172 and formed 3.86% and other workers numbered 59,249 and formed 72.14%. Total workers numbered 82,129 and formed 37.35% of the total population, and non-workers numbered 137,734 and formed 62.65% of the population.

The District Human Development Report points out that in the blocks of the region situated in the close proximity of the Kolkata metropolis, overwhelming majority are involved in the non-agricultural sector for their livelihood. On the other hand, in the Sundarbans settlements, overwhelming majority are dependent on agriculture. In the intermediate region, there is again predominance of the non-agricultural sector. Though the region is not very close to Kolkata, many places are well connected and some industrial/ economic development has taken place.

Note: In the census records a person is considered a cultivator, if the person is engaged in cultivation/ supervision of land owned by self/government/institution. When a person who works on another person's land for wages in cash or kind or share, is regarded as an agricultural labourer. Household industry is defined as an industry conducted by one or more members of the family within the household or village, and one that does not qualify for registration as a factory under the Factories Act. Other workers are persons engaged in some economic activity other than cultivators, agricultural labourers and household workers. It includes factory, mining, plantation, transport and office workers, those engaged in business and commerce, teachers, entertainment artistes and so on.

=== Infrastructure ===
There are 65 inhabited villages in the Sonarpur CD block, as per the District Census Handbook, South Twenty-four Parganas, 2011. 100% villages have power supply. 61 villages (93.85%) have drinking water supply. 7 villages (10.77%) have post offices. 64 villages (98.46%) have telephones (including landlines, public call offices and mobile phones). 50 villages (76.92%) have pucca (paved) approach roads and 17 villages (26.15%) have transport communication (includes bus service, rail facility and navigable waterways). 2 villages (3.08%) has agricultural credit societies and 5 villages (7.69%) have banks.

=== Agriculture ===
The South 24 Parganas had played a significant role in the Tebhaga movement launched by the Communist Party of India in 1946. Subsequently, Operation Barga was aimed at securing tenancy rights for the peasants. In the Sonarpur CD block 3,020.43 acres of land was acquired and vested. Out of this 1,245.06 acres or 41.22% of the vested land was distributed among the peasants. The total number of patta (document) holders was 2,992.

According to the District Human Development Report, agriculture is an important source of livelihood in the South Twentyfour Parganas district. The amount of cultivable land per agricultural worker is only 0.41 hectare in the district. Moreover, the irrigation facilities have not been extended to a satisfactory scale. Agriculture mostly remains a mono-cropped activity.

According to the District Census Handbook, the saline soil of the district is unfit for cultivation, but the non-salty lands are very fertile. While rice is the main food crop, jute is the main cash crop.

In 2013–14, there were 42 fertiliser depots, 8 seed stores and 87 fair price shops in the Sonarpur CD block.

In 2013–14, the Sonarpur CD block produced 1,343 tonnes of Aman paddy, the main winter crop from 1,763 hectares.

=== Irrigation ===
In the Sonarpur CD block, in 2013–14, 12.19 hectares were irrigated by deep tube wells.

=== Pisciculture ===
In the Sonarpur CD block, in 2013–14, net area under effective pisciculture was 1,432 hectares, engaging 10,280 persons in the profession, and with an approximate annual production of 41,300 quintals.

Pisciculture is an important source of employment in the South 24 Parganas district. As of 2001, more than 4.5 lakh people were engaged in pisciculture. Out of this 2.57 lakhs were from the 13 blocks in the Sundarbans settlements.

=== Banking ===
In 2013–14, the Sonarpur CD block had offices of 30 commercial banks and 3 gramin banks.

=== Backward Regions Grant Fund ===
The South 24 Parganas district is listed as a backward region and receives financial support from the Backward Regions Grant Fund. The fund, created by the Government of India, is designed to redress regional imbalances in development. As of 2012, 272 districts across the country were listed under this scheme. The list includes 11 districts of West Bengal.

== Transport ==
Sonarpur CD block has 13 originating/ terminating bus routes.

Garia, Narendrapur, Sonarpur Junction, Subhashgram, Bidyadharpur and Kalikapur are stations on the Sealdah South section.

== Education ==
In 2013–14, the Sonarpur CD block had 86 primary schools with 7,131 students, 8 middle schools with 443 students, 3 high schools with 1,124 students and 9 higher secondary schools with 6,193 students. The Sonarpur CD block had 2 technical/ professional institutions with 2,175 students and 533 institutions for special and non-formal education with 12,513 students. Rajpur-Sonarpur municipal area (outside the CD block) had 2 general degree colleges with 3,171 students.

See also – Education in India

As per the 2011 census, in the Sonarpur CD block, among the 65 inhabited villages, 4 villages did not have a school, 20 villages had two or more primary schools, 26 villages had at least 1 primary and 1 middle school and 8 villages had at least 1 middle and 1 secondary school.

== Healthcare ==
Certain areas of the South 24 Parganas district have been identified where ground water is affected by Arsenic Contamination. High levels of arsenic in ground water were found in twelve CD blocks of the district. Water samples collected from tubewells in the affected places contained arsenic above the normal level (10 micrograms per litre as specified by the World Health Organization). The affected CD blocks are Baruipur, Bhangar I, Bhangar II, Bishnupur I, Bishnupur II, Basanti, Budge Budge II, Canning I, Canning II, Sonarpur, Magrahat II and Jaynagar I.

In 2014, the Sonarpur CD block had 1 rural hospital, 4 primary health centres and 3 private nursing homes with total 84 beds and 19 doctors (excluding private bodies). It had 23 family welfare subcentres. 5,681 patients were treated indoor and 251,117 patients were treated outdoor in the hospitals, health centres and subcentres of the CD block.

According to the 2011 census, in the Sonarpur CD block, 2 villages had primary health centres, 24 villages had primary health subcentres, 9 villages had maternity and child welfare centres, 1 village had a veterinary hospital, 14 villages had medicine shops and out of the 65 inhabited villages 22 villages had no medical facilities.

Sonarpur Rural Hospital at Sonarpur with 25 beds is the major government medical facility in the Sonarpur CD block. There are primary health centres at Kalikapur (with 10 beds ), Fartabad (PO Garia) (with 6 beds), Langolberia (PO Dakshin Govindapur) (with 6 beds) and Kheadaha (with 6 beds).
