= Harinavi =

- Neighbourhood
- Location in West Bengal Location in India
- Coordinates: 22.4125°N 88.4186°E
- Country: India
- State: West Bengal
- Division: Presidency
- District: South 24 Parganas
- Region: Greater Kolkata

Government
  - Type: Municipality
  - Body: Rajpur Sonarpur Municipality
- Elevation: 9 m (30 ft)

Languages
  - Official: Bengali
  - Additional official: English
- Time zone: UTC+5:30 (IST)
- PIN: 700148
- Telephone code: +91 33
- Vehicle registration: WB-19 to WB-22, WB-95 to WB-99
- Lok Sabha constituency: Jadavpur
- Vidhan Sabha constituency: Sonarpur Dakshin
- Website: www.rajpursonarpurmunicipality.in

Harinavi is a locality of Rajpur Sonarpur in South 24 Parganas district in the Indian state of West Bengal. It is a part of the area covered by the Kolkata Metropolitan Development Authority (KMDA).

== History ==
Many janapadas grew up along the old Bhagirathi channel from the ancient times till around the 16th century: Kalighat, Boral, Rajpur, Harinavi, Mahinagar, Baruipur, Baharu, Jaynagar Majilpur, Chhatrabhog etc. Bipradas Pipilai's Manasavijaya, composed in 1495, mentions many places in this region. “Chand Sadagar, a merchant character of the Manasavijaya, reached Baruipur, from Kalighat, through the old Bhagirathi channel. From there he proceeded towards Chhatrabhog, and then traveling through Hatiagarh pargana reached the open sea.” Chaitanyadeva (1486–1534) also went through this route. Travelling by boat to Puri he halted at the village of Atisara, near Baruipur. "His last stoppage in 24 Parganas was at Chhatrabhog, now a village within the jurisdiction of the Mathurapur police station. Chhatrabhog seems to have been an important river-port on the old Bhagirathi channel." Rama Chandra Khan, the zamindar of Chhatrabhog, helped Chaitanyadeva to continue with his journey.

== Geography ==
Cities and towns in the northern part of Baruipur subdivision (including Sonarpur, Bhangar I & II CD blocks) in South 24 Parganas district
M: municipal city/ town, CT: census town, R: rural/ urban centre, N: neighbourhood
Owing to space constraints in the small map, the actual locations in a larger map may vary slightly

=== Area overview ===
Baruipur subdivision is a rural subdivision with moderate levels of urbanization. 31.05% of the population lives in the urban areas and 68.95% lives in the rural areas. In the northern portion of the subdivision (shown in the map alongside) there are 10 census towns. The entire district is situated in the Ganges Delta and the northern part of the subdivision is a flat plain bordering the metropolis of Kolkata.

Note: The map alongside presents some of the notable locations in the subdivision. All places marked in the map are linked in the larger full screen map.

=== Location ===
Harinavi is located at 22°24′45″N 88°25′07″E. It has an average elevation of 9 metres (30 ft).

== Transport ==
Harinavi is on the State Highway 1.

Subhashgram railway station is located nearby.

== Education ==
- Harinavi DVAS High School is a Bengali-medium High School. It was established in 1866 and has facilities for teaching from class I to class XII.
- Harinavi Subhasini Balika Sikshalaya is Bengali-medium Girls' School. It was established in 1926 and has facilities for teaching from class I to class XII.

== Healthcare ==
Sonarpur State-General Hospital, with 125 beds, at Subhasgram, is the major government medical facility in the Sonarpur CD block.
