= Mallikpur =

- Census Town
- Location in West Bengal Location in India
- Coordinates: 22.3986°N 88.4281°E
- Country: India
- State: West Bengal
- District: South 24 Parganas
- CD block: Baruipur

Area
  - Total: 1.44 km^{2} (0.56 sq mi)
- Elevation: 9 m (30 ft)

Population (2011)
  - Total: 19,120
  - Density: 13,300/km^{2} (34,400/sq mi)

Languages
  - Official: Bengali
  - Additional official: English
- Time zone: UTC+5:30 (IST)
- PIN: 700145
- Telephone code: +91 33
- Vehicle registration: WB-19 to WB-22, WB-95 to WB-99
- Lok Sabha constituency: Jadavpur
- Vidhan Sabha constituency: Baruipur Paschim
- Website: www.s24pgs.gov.in

Mallikpur is a census town and a gram panchayat within the jurisdiction of the Baruipur police station in the Baruipur CD block in the Baruipur subdivision of the South 24 Parganas district in the Indian state of West Bengal.

== Geography ==
Cities and towns in the southern part of Baruipur subdivision (including Baruipur, Jaynagar I & II, Kultali CD blocks) in South 24 Parganas district
M: municipal city/ town, CT: census town, R: rural/ urban centre, N: neighbourhood, H: historical place/ religious centre
Places linked with coastal activity are marked in blue
Owing to space constraints in the small map, the actual locations in a larger map may vary slightly

=== Area overview ===
Baruipur subdivision is a rural subdivision with moderate levels of urbanization. 31.05% of the population lives in the urban areas and 68.95% lives in the rural areas. In the southern portion of the subdivision (shown in the map alongside) there are 20 census towns. The entire district is situated in the Ganges Delta and the southern part is covered by the Baruipur-Jaynagar Plain. Archaeological excavations at Dhosa and Tilpi, on the bank of the Piyali River indicate the existence of human habitation around 2,000 years ago.

Note: The map alongside presents some of the notable locations in the subdivision. All places marked in the map are linked in the larger full screen map.

=== Location ===
Mallikpur is located at 22°23′55″N 88°25′41″E. It has an average elevation of 9 metres (30 ft).

Petua, Panchghara, Mallikpur and Hariharpur form a cluster of census towns in the Baruipur CD block, as per the map of the Baruipur CD block in the District Census Handbook for the South 24 Parganas. This cluster has Rajpur Sonarpur on the east and Bidyadharpur on the north, both in the Sonarpur CD block, as per the map of the Sonarpur CD block in the District Census Handbook for the South 24 Parganas.

== Demographics ==
According to the 2011 Census of India, Mallikpur had a total population of 19,120, of which 9,754 (51%) were males and 9,366 (49%) were females. There were 2,849 persons in the age range of 0 to 6 years. The total number of literate persons in Mallikpur was 10,698 (69.75% of the population over 6 years).

== Infrastructure ==
According to the District Census Handbook 2011, Mallikpur covered an area of 1.4335 km^{2}. Among the physical aspects, Mallikpur railway station is in the town. Among the civic amenities, it had 8 km roads with open drains, the protected water supply involved covered wells and hand pumps. It had 2,520 domestic electric connections and 252 road light points. Among the medical facilities it had 1 hospital, 1 maternity and child welfare centre, 1 veterinary hospital and 5 medicine shops. Among the educational facilities it had were 5 primary schools, 2 secondary schools, 2 senior secondary schools. An important commodity it produced was shoe. It had the branch office of 1 nationalised bank.

== Transport ==
Mallikpur is on the State Highway 1.

Mallikpur railway station is on the Sealdah–Namkhana line of the Kolkata Suburban Railway system.

=== Commuters ===
With the electrification of the railways, suburban traffic has grown tremendously since the 1960s. As of 2005–06, more than 1.7 million (17 lakhs) commuters use the Kolkata Suburban Railway system daily. After the partition of India, refugees from erstwhile East Pakistan and Bangladesh had a strong impact on the development of urban areas in the periphery of Kolkata. The new immigrants depended on Kolkata for their livelihood, thus increasing the number of commuters. Eastern Railway runs 1,272 EMU trains daily.

== Education ==
Mallikpur Abdus Shokur High School is a boys only institution. It is affiliated with the West Bengal Board of Secondary Education.

Subhasgram Nabatara Vidyalaya is a Bengali-medium coeducational institution, established in 1962. It has facilities for teaching from class V to class XII.

Gobindapur Ratneswar High School is a Bengali-medium coeducational school, established in 1921. It has facilities for teaching from class V to class XII.

== Healthcare ==
Hariharpur Block Primary Health Centre, with 10 beds, at Hariharpur (PO Mallikpur), is the major government medical facility in the Baruipur CD block.
