= Bidyadharpur =

- Census Town
- Location in West Bengal Location in India
- Coordinates: 22.4233°N 88.4537°E
- Country: India
- State: West Bengal
- District: South 24 Parganas
- CD block: Sonarpur

Area
  - Total: 1.14 km^{2} (0.44 sq mi)
- Elevation: 9 m (30 ft)

Population (2011)
  - Total: 4,630
  - Density: 4,060/km^{2} (10,500/sq mi)

Languages
  - Official: Bengali
  - Additional official: English
- Time zone: UTC+5:30 (IST)
- PIN: 700150
- Telephone code: +91 33
- Vehicle registration: WB-19 to WB-22, WB-95 to WB-99
- Lok Sabha constituency: Jadavpur
- Vidhan Sabha constituency: Sonarpur Dakshin
- Website: www.s24pgs.gov.in

Bidyadharpur is a census town within the jurisdiction of the Sonarpur police station in the Sonarpur CD block in the Baruipur subdivision of the South 24 Parganas district in the Indian state of West Bengal.

== Geography ==
Cities and towns in the northern part of Baruipur subdivision (including Sonarpur, Bhangar I & II CD blocks) in South 24 Parganas district
M: municipal city/ town, CT: census town, R: rural/ urban centre, N: neighbourhood
Owing to space constraints in the small map, the actual locations in a larger map may vary slightly

=== Area overview ===
Baruipur subdivision is a rural subdivision with moderate levels of urbanization. 31.05% of the population lives in the urban areas and 68.95% lives in the rural areas. In the northern portion of the subdivision (shown in the map alongside) there are 10 census towns. The entire district is situated in the Ganges Delta and the northern part of the subdivision is a flat plain bordering the metropolis of Kolkata.

Note: The map alongside presents some of the notable locations in the subdivision. All places marked in the map are linked in the larger full screen map.

=== Location ===
Bidyadharpur is located at 22°25′24″N 88°27′13″E. It has an average elevation of 9 metres (30 ft).

Petua, Panchghara, Mallikpur and Hariharpur form a cluster of census towns in the Baruipur CD block, as per the map of the Baruipur CD block in the District Census Handbook for the South 24 Parganas. This cluster has Rajpur Sonarpur on the east and Bidyadharpur on the north, both in the Sonarpur CD block, as per the map of Sonarpur CD block in the District Census Handbook for the South 24 Parganas.

== Demographics ==
According to the 2011 Census of India, Bidyadharpur had a total population of 4,630, of which 2,327 (50%) were males and 2,303 (50%) were females. There were 549 people in the age range of 0 to 6 years. The total number of literate persons in Bidyadharpur was 3,040 (74.49% of the population over 6 years).

== Infrastructure ==
According to the District Census Handbook 2011, Bidyadharpur covered an area of 1.1421 km^{2}. Among the physical aspects, Bidyadharpur railway station is in the town. Among the civic amenities, the protected water supply involved service reservoir. It had 430 domestic electric connections. Among the medical facilities it had 1 dispensary/ health centre. Among the educational facilities it had were 1 primary school, the nearest middle school at Madgar 1 km away, the nearest secondary school at Malia 1 km away, the nearest senior secondary school at Ghasiara close by.

== Transport ==
Sonarpur-Chak Baria Road links Bidyadharpur to the State Highway 1.

Bidyadharpur railway station is on the Sealdah–Canning line of the Kolkata Suburban Railway system.

=== Commuters ===
With the electrification of the railways, suburban traffic has grown tremendously since the 1960s. As of 2005–06, more than 1.7 million (17 lakhs) commuters use the Kolkata Suburban Railway system daily. After the partition of India, refugees from erstwhile East Pakistan/ Bangladesh had a strong impact on the development of urban areas in the periphery of Kolkata. The new immigrants depended on Kolkata for their livelihood, thus increasing the number of commuters. Eastern Railway runs 1,272 EMU trains daily.

== Education ==
Ghasiara Bidyapith is a high school.

== Healthcare ==
Sonarpur Rural Hospital, with 25 beds, at Rajpur Sonarpur, is the major government medical facility in the Sonarpur CD block.
