= Swami Lokeshwarananda =

Hindu Ramakrishna order monk

Lokeshwarananda
- Swami Lokeshwaranandaji

Personal life
- Born: 19 April 1909 Kheragachi Village, Satkhira District, Bengal Presidency, British India
- Died: 31 December 1998; Belur Math, West Bengal, India

Religious life
- Religion: Hinduism
- Philosophy: Vedanta

Swami Lokeshwarananda (1909–1998) was a monk of the Ramakrishna order founded by Vivekananda. He was the founder of the pathuriaghata branch of the Ramakrishna mission, which later blossomed into the Ramakrishna Mission Narendrapur. He represented the Ramakrishna mission at various international conferences. He had considerable moral and intellectual influence, but never became an office bearer of the mission. He was also part of a delegation to the Pope, the head of the Roman Catholic Church.

== Biography ==
=== Pathuriaghata ===
Lokeshwarananda was posted as the secretary of the then nascent Pathuriaghata branch of the Ramakrishna mission. He was instrumental in transforming it into a full-fledged and actively functioning branch centre. The centre was founded immediately after the Bengal famine of 1943. It first served as a home for abandoned, orphaned and financially destitute boys. Since its relocation in 1957 to its present site in the southern suburbs of Calcutta, it has grown into a huge complex with varied activities. The Ramakrishna mission ashrama at Narendrapur owes a lot for all this to him. He was an adept administrator and, at the same time, a caring teacher. He simultaneously managed the duties of Ramakrishna Mission Vidyalaya, Narendrapur and Ramakrishna Mission Residential College, Narendrapur.

He studied at the Bangabasi College of the University of Calcutta.

=== Golpark ===
Swami Lokeshwarananda took charge of the Ramakrishna Mission Institute of Culture at Golpark and gave his all towards its development. He put in tremendous efforts, which saw the Golpark centre blossom and grow in stature as one of the most important centres of the Ramakrishna Mission. It became an important hub for cultural affairs of the Mission, and a school for teaching Indian and foreign languages was opened here. He remained its secretary till his demise in 1998.
