= B.D.Memorial International =

Private English Medium Co-ed School in Kolkata

Location
- Kolkata, West Bengal; India; 22.44916888°N .388906°E

Information
- Other names: BDMI, B.D.Memorial International
- Type: Private
- Established: 1966
- Founder: Draupadi Devi Khaitan & Shri G.N. Khaitan
- School board: CBSE
- Chairman: Shailesh Khaitan
- Principal: Ms. Madhumita Sengupta
- Grades: Toddler to 12
- Gender: Co-ed
- Campus type: Urban
- Colours: Navy blue, gold and white
- Song: We are the students of BDM International
- Affiliation: CBSE
- Website: www.bdmi.org

B.D.M International (formerly Bhagawati Devi Memorial Institute) is an institute affiliated with the CBSE board in Pratapgarh, Rajpur Sonarpur, West Bengal, India. It has over 10,000 students. The school is English medium with Bengali and Hindi being taught as vernaculars.
