= Debasish Dhar =

Indian politician (born 1976)

Member of the West Bengal Legislative Assembly
- Incumbent
- Assumed office 4 May 2026
- Preceded by: Firdousi Begum
- Constituency: Sonarpur Uttar

Personal details
- Party: Bharatiya Janata Party
- Profession: Politician

Debasish Dhar (born 1976) is an Indian politician from West Bengal. He is a member of West Bengal Legislative Assembly from Sonarpur Uttar Assembly constituency in South 24 Parganas district representing the Bharatiya Janata Party.

Dhar is from Sonarpur, South 24 Parganas district, West Bengal. He is the son of the late Jyotish Ranjan Dhar. He did his B.Sc. honours in physics in 1997 at Surendranath College which is affiliated with Calcutta University. He is a retired government employee and declared assets worth Rs.2 crore in his affidavit to the Election Commission of India.

He won the Sonarpur Uttar Assembly constituency in the 2026 West Bengal Legislative Assembly election. he polled 1,19,824 votes and defeated his nearest rival, Firdousi Begum of the All India Trinamool Congress, by a margin of 9,807 votes.
