= Firdousi Begum =

Indian politician

- ফিরদৌসী বেগম

Member of the West Bengal Legislative Assembly
- In office 2011–2026
- Preceded by: Constituency Established
- Succeeded by: Debasish Dhar
- Constituency: Sonarpur Uttar

Personal details
- Born: Kolkata, West Bengal, India
- Party: All India Trinamool Congress
- Spouse: Nazrul Ali Mondal
- Children: Tanweer Mondal

Firdousi Begum (born 1979) is an Indian politician from West Bengal. In 2011, 2016 and 2021, she was elected as MLA of Sonarpur Uttar Vidhan Sabha constituency in West Bengal Legislative Assembly.

Begum is an Indian politician of All India Trinamool Congress [AITC]. She is now parliamentary secretary of the department of panchayats and rural development since 3 January 2014.

She joined All India Trinamool Congress as a lady Councillor of Rajpur-Sonarpur Municipality in June, 2004.

She was vice-chairperson of Rajpur-Sonarpur Municipality since 2009 to 2013.

She is also the first lady Member of Legislative Assembly since May, 2011 of Sonarpur Constituency.

She is also Member of District planning committee of south 24 parganas and member of standing committee of privileges and finance excise, development and planning.

She is from All India Trinamool Congress.
