= Malini Bhattacharya =

Indian politician

Member of Parliament, Lok Sabha
- In office 24 November 1989 – 9 May 1996
- Preceded by: Mamata Banerjee
- Succeeded by: Krishna Bose
- Constituency: Jadavpur

Personal details
- Born: 14 October 1943 (age 82) Dacca, Bengal Presidency, British India
- Party: Communist Party of India (Marxist)
- Education: Diocesan School, Kolkata; Presidency College; Jadavpur University

Malini Bhattacharya is an Indian politician belonging to the Communist Party of India (Marxist). She was elected to the Lok Sabha, the lower house of the Parliament of India, from Jadavpur, West Bengal.

An author, scholar, translator, playwright and activist in the women's movement, she is a retired professor of English and former director, School of Women's Studies, Jadavpur University.
