= Ramakrishna Mission Residential College, Narendrapur =

Ramakrishna Mission Residential College (Autonomous), Narendrapur
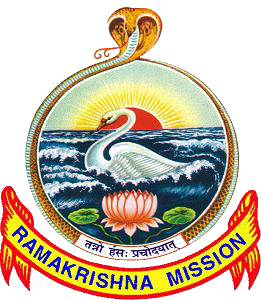
- Emblem
- Motto: Atmano mokshartham jagat hitaya cha (आत्मनो मोक्षार्थं जगद्धिताय च) (For one's own salvation and for the welfare of the world)
- Type: Autonomous
- Established: 1960
- Principal: Swami Ekachittananda
- Academic staff: 82
- Undergraduates: 542
- Postgraduates: 115
- Location: Kolkata, West Bengal, India; 22.438619°N 88.400024°E
- Campus: Urban
- Colors: White
- Affiliations: University of Calcutta
- Website: www.rkmrc.in
- Location in West Bengal Ramakrishna Mission Residential College, Narendrapur (India)

Ramakrishna Mission Residential College (Autonomous), Narendrapur is an institute for pursuing undergraduate and postgraduate studies in the Indian state of West Bengal. It is an autonomous college located in Narendrapur, Kolkata. The college was established in 1960 and is affiliated with the University of Calcutta. It is run by the Ramakrishna Mission Ashrama, Narendrapur. It is a residential, boys-only college.

It is ranked 24th among colleges in India by the National Institutional Ranking Framework (NIRF) in 2024.

== History ==
The history of Ramakrishna Mission Residential College is similar to that of its parent organization, Ramakrishna Mission Ashrama, Narendrapur. In 1943, in the wake of the disastrous Bengal Famine, monks of the Ramakrishna Order set up a students’ home at Pathuriaghata in North Kolkata.

The home was housed on a small plot of land earmarked for the education of young college and university students. It slowly but steadily accumulated a reputation for nurturing meritorious but indigent students. In 1957, the home was relocated to a larger compound at Narendrapur.

The college was established on the Ashrama campus in July 1960. Affiliated to the University of Calcutta, its first batch of students commenced classes in August 1960. Much later, in 1976, the Higher Secondary Unit of the West Bengal Council of Higher Secondary Education started functioning on the college premises, but was shifted to the Vidyalaya after 2006. Autonomous status was conferred upon the college in 2008. Fully residential, this boys' college follows the same principles and objectives as all other institutions functioning under the aegis of the Ramakrishna Mission.

== Academics ==
There is a three-year semester system for an undergraduate degree. The core subjects available to a student based on the Choice Based Credit System (CBCS) are Chemistry, Computer Science, Physics, Mathematics, Statistics, Economics, English, Bengali, Sanskrit, History, Political Science, and Philosophy.

There is a two-year semester system for a postgraduate degree. The courses available to a student are Chemistry, Computer Science, Physics, and English.

The University of Calcutta has granted Ramakrishna Mission Residential College (Autonomous), Narendrapur the permission to start Vivekananda Centre for Research to conduct M. Phil./Ph.D. courses from the academic session 2015–16.

It offers regular Ph.D. courses in physics, chemistry and mathematics.

== Rankings ==
College rankings

General – India
- NIRF (Colleges) (2021): 21
- NIRF (Colleges) (2022): 19

Ramakrishna Mission Residential College has been ranked 19th among colleges in India by the National Institutional Ranking Framework (NIRF) in 2022.

== Alumni ==
- Sandip Chakrabarti - Scientist

== Campus ==
The campus of the college occupies 181 acres (0.73 km^{2}). The college campus contains hostels, libraries, multi-gyms, swimming pools, sports facilities, and medical facilities.

There are four hostels under the supervision of the college:

- Brahmananda Bhavana: In the presence of Swami Lokeswaranandaji Maharaj (the founding monk of the Narendrapur Ashrama) and other dignitaries, Morarji Desai, then-Finance Minister of India, inaugurated the building. The oldest of all the hostels at Narendrapur Ramakrishna Mission Ashrama opened on 5 December 1958.
- Shree Gouranga Bhavana: This bhavan possesses a distinctive characteristic in the form of a centrally positioned open airspace. The hostel is oriented towards the east.
- Ramakrishnananda Bhavana: This bhavan is a three-story building with an adjoining dining hall.
- Adbhutananda Bhavana: This bhavan is a three-story building dedicated to the accommodation of college students.

The college also provides a library. The college building has four floors. A swimming pool beside the Brahmananda Bhavana was recently inaugurated.

On 16 September 2018, Sarada Mandir, the college annex, was inaugurated by the president of Belur Math, Swami Smaranananda.

== See also ==
- List of colleges affiliated to the University of Calcutta
- Education in India
- Education in West Bengal
