= Sarah Kimmins =

Canadian epigeneticist

Sarah Kimmins is a Canadian scientist whose research explores the role of epigenetics in germ cell (i.e. sperm and oocyte) development, fertility and offspring health. She is a professor in epigenomics, development and disease at the University of Montreal, in the Department of Pathology and Cellular Biology, in the Faculty of Medicine and is Senior Group Leader at the Centre de Recherche du Centre Hospitalier de l'Université de Montréal.

As a professor at McGill (2005–2022) she was awarded junior (Tier 2) and senior Canada Research Chairs (Tier 1) in Epigenetics, Reproduction and Development. She is currently an adjunct professor in the Department of Pharmacology and Therapeutics at McGill. Kimmins completed a Bachelor of Science, Master of Science and a PhD (2003) at Dalhousie University. Kimmins has received The Society for the Study of Reproduction's Young Investigator Award (2016) and the American Society of Andrology's Young Andrologist Award (2014).

== Career ==
Kimmins' research in mice has demonstrated that nutritional deficiencies in paternal diet lead to a higher rate of birth defects in offspring, raising concerns that a human father's diet before conception may play an important role in a child's health. For HISTurn (a project which aims to diagnose male infertility), Kimmins received $25,000 as part of the Prelaunch category in the McGill Innovation Fund (MIF) competition. She has previously spoken about male infertility for various media outlets, including CBC News and Vox.

Her clinical research program has focussed on paternal health and fertility, leading to the development of a precision medicine based fertility diagnostic for men and to the McGill spin-out, HisTurn inc. where she is a Scientific Founder and CEO.

She has published over 100 academic publications, resulting in over 4,400 citations, and an h-index and i10-index of 29 and 44 respectively.

== Selected academic publications ==
- "Chromatin remodelling and epigenetic features of germ cells". S Kimmins and P Sassone-Corsi. Nature 434 (7033), 583–589. doi: 10.1038/nature03368.
- Lismer A, and Kimmins S. "Emerging evidence that the mammalian sperm epigenome serves as an epigenetic template for embryo development". Nature Communications 2023 Apr 14;14(1):2142. doi: 10.1038/s41467-023-37820
- Lismer A, Lafleur C, Siklenka K, Lambrot R, Brind’Amour J, Lorincz M, Dumeaux, V, Kimmins S. "Histone methylation in sperm transmits environmentally-induced phenotypes to the embryo". Developmental Cell, Vol. 6, issue 5, pp671-686. DOI: 10.1016/j.devcel.2021.01.014
- Siklenka K, Erkek S, Godmann M, Lambrot R*, McGraw S. Lafleur C*, Cohen T, Xia J. Sudermann M, Hallett M, Trasler J, Peters A, and Kimmins S. "Disruption of histone methylation in developing sperm has dire consequences for embryo development and effects are inherited transgenerationally". Science. 2015 Nov 6;350(6261). DOI: 10.1126/science.aab2006
- Lambrot R, Xu. C, Saint-Phar S, Chountalos G*, Suderman M. Hallett M., Kimmins S. "Low paternal dietary folate alters the mouse sperm epigenome and is associated with negative pregnancy outcomes". December 10, 2013 Nature Communications DOI 10.1038/ncomms3889
