= Rashtriya Janasachetan Party =

- Founder: Badal Debnath
- Split from: BJP
- Political position: Centre-Right
- Colours
- Alliance: National Democratic Alliance (India)
- Seats in Lok Sabha: 0
- Seats in Rajya Sabha: 0
- Seats in: 0

The Rashtriya Janasachetan Party is a political party in West Bengal, India. Badal Debnath is the founding president of the party. The party claims to uphold the ideals of Swami Vivekananda, Gandhi and Subhas Chandra Bose. The party fielded four candidates in the 2011 West Bengal Legislative Assembly election, whom together mustered 3,001 votes.
