= Narendrapur railway station =

Railway Station in West Bengal, India

Narendrapur
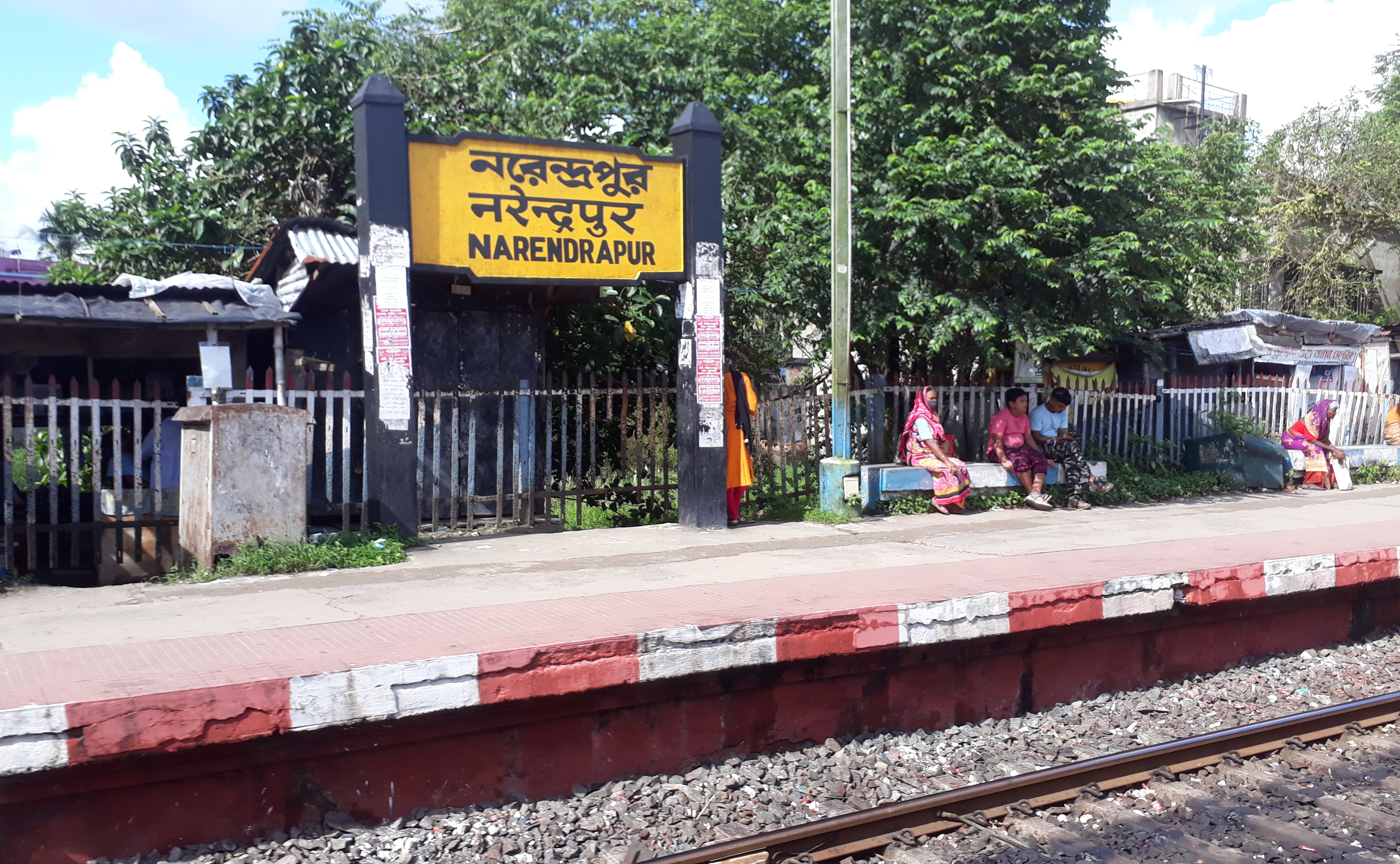
- Narendrapur Railway Station

General information
- Location: Narendrapur, Kolkata, West Bengal
- Coordinates: 22.454167°N 88.418348°E
- Elevation: 9 metres (30 ft)
- System: Kolkata Suburban Railway Station
- Owner: Indian Railways
- Operator: Eastern Railway
- Line: Main line
- Platforms: 2
- Tracks: 2

Construction
- Structure type: Standard (on-ground station)
- Parking: Not Available
- Cycle facilities: Not Available
- Accessible: Not Available

Other information
- Status: Functioning
- Station code: NRPR
- Zone(s): Eastern Railway
- Division(s): Sealdah

History
- Opened: 1862; 164 years ago
- Electrified: 1965–66
- Former names: Eastern Bengal Railway
Services
Preceding station	Kolkata Suburban Railway	Following station
Sonarpur Junction towards Baruipur Junction	Sealdah South Main line	Garia towards Sealdah
Route map
Location

Narendrapur railway station is a Kolkata Suburban Railway Station on the Sealdah South line. It is under the jurisdiction of the Sealdah railway division in the Eastern Railway zone of the Indian Railways. It serves the local area of Narendrapur in Kolkata in the Indian state of West Bengal.

== History ==
In 1862, the Eastern Bengal Railway constructed a 1,676 mm (5 ft 6 in)-wide broad-gauge railway from Sealdah to Sonarpur Junction via Narendrapur.

== Electrification ==
Electrification from Sealdah to Sonarpur Junction including Narendrapur was completed with 25 kV AC overhead system in 1965–66.

== Station complex ==
The platform is very much well sheltered. The station possesses many facilities including water and sanitation. It is well connected to the SH-1. There is a proper approach road to this station.
