= Sonarpur Uttar Assembly constituency =

Legislative Assembly Constituency in West Bengal, India

Sonarpur Uttar
- Constituency No. 151 for the West Bengal Legislative Assembly
- Interactive Map Outlining Sonarpur Uttar Assembly Constituency

Constituency details
- Country: India
- Region: East India
- State: West Bengal
- District: South 24 Parganas
- Lok Sabha constituency: Jadavpur
- Established: 1962
- Total electors: 300,229
- Reservation: None

Member of Legislative Assembly
- 18th West Bengal Legislative Assembly
- Incumbent Debasish Dhar
- Party: Bharatiya Janata Party
- Elected year: 2026

Sonarpur Uttar Assembly constituency is a Legislative Assembly constituency of South 24 Parganas district in the Indian State of West Bengal.

== Overview ==
As per order of the Delimitation Commission in respect of the Delimitation of constituencies in the West Bengal, Sonarpur Uttar Assembly constituency is composed of the following:

- Ward Nos. 1, 2, 3, 4, 5, 6, 7,8, 27, 28, 29, 30, 31, 32, 33, 34 and 35 of Rajpur Sonarpur municipality
- Banhooghly-I, Banhooghly-II, Kamrabad, Kheyadaha-I and Kheyadaha-II gram panchayats of Sonarpur community development block

Sonarpur Uttar Assembly constituency is a part of No. 22 Jadavpur (Lok Sabha constituency).

== Members of the Legislative Assembly ==
Election	Member	Party Affiliation
Sonarpur
1962	Khagendra Kumar Roy Choudhury	Communist Party of India
1967	Gangadhar Naskar	Communist Party of India (Marxist)
1969	Gangadhar Naskar	Communist Party of India (Marxist)
1971	Gangadhar Naskar	Communist Party of India (Marxist)
1972	Kansari Halder	Communist Party of India
1977	Gangadhar Naskar	Communist Party of India (Marxist)
1982	Gangadhar Naskar	Communist Party of India (Marxist)
1987	Bhadreswar Mondal	Communist Party of India (Marxist)
1991	Bhadreswar Mondal	Communist Party of India (Marxist)
1996	Bhadreswar Mondal	Communist Party of India (Marxist)
2001	Nimai Chandra Mondal	Trinamool Congress
2006	Shyamal Naskar	Communist Party of India (Marxist)
Sonarpur Uttar
2011	Firdousi Begum	Trinamool Congress
2016	Firdousi Begum	Trinamool Congress
2021	Firdousi Begum	Trinamool Congress
2026	Debasish Dhar	Bharatiya Janata Party

== Election results ==
=== 2026 ===
2026 West Bengal Legislative Assembly election: Sonarpur Uttar
Party	Candidate	Votes	%	±%
BJP	Debasish Dhar	119,824	46.73	+11.86
AITC	Firdousi Begum	110,017	42.9	−6.98
CPI(M)	Monalisa Sinha	19,744	7.7	−4.52
NOTA	None of the above	1,599	0.62	−0.26
Majority		9,807	3.83	−11.18
Turnout		256,444	93.83	+13.75
BJP gain from AITC		Swing		

=== 2021 ===
2021 West Bengal Legislative Assembly election: Sonarpur Uttar
Party	Candidate	Votes	%	±%
AITC	Firdousi Begum	119,957	49.88	
BJP	Ranjan Baidya	83,867	34.87	
CPI(M)	Monalisa Sinha	29,400	12.22	
NOTA	None of the above	2,114	0.88	
Majority		36,090	15.01	
Turnout		240,495	80.08	
AITC hold		Swing		

=== 2016 ===
Legislative Assembly Election, 2016: Sonarpur Uttar
Party	Candidate	Votes	%	±%
AITC	Firdousi Begum	101,939	50.31	−5.09
CPI(M)	Jyotirmoyee Sikdar	77,059	38.03	−1.33
BJP	Satyabrata Dutta	15,218	7.51	+5.78
BSP	Ajit Baul	1770	0.87	
Turnout		202,625	82.03	
AITC hold		Swing		

=== 2011 ===
Legislative Assembly Election, 2011: Sonarpur Uttar
Party	Candidate	Votes	%	±%
AITC	Firdousi Begum	89,841	55.4	
CPI(M)	Shyamal Naskar	63,817	39.36	
BJP	Debasish Purkait	3,618	1.73	
BSP	Ranjan Kumar Halder	1,290		
Independent	Shyamal Naskar	1,276		
Independent	Fakir Mohammed Laskar	1,141		
Independent	Manoj Kumar Dutta	747		
Independent	Bhushan Mondal	42		
Turnout		162,155	82.32	
AITC win (new seat)				

=== 2006 ===
In 2006 Shyamal Naskar of CPI(M) won the Sonarpur Assembly constituency defeating his nearest rival Nirmal Chandra Mondal of AITC. In 2001, Nirmal Chandra Mondal of AITC defeated Abha Mondal of CPI(M). Bhadreswar Mondal of CPI(M) defeated Nirmal Chandra Mondal of INC in 1996 and 1991, and Sovaranjan Sardar of INC in 1987. Gangadhar Naskar of CPI(M) defeated Ramkanta Mondal of ICS in 1982 and Gourhari Sardar of INC in 1977.

=== 2001 ===
Legislative Assembly Election, 2001
Party	Candidate	Votes	%	±%
AITC	Nirmal Chandra Mondal	99,893		
CPI(M)	Abha Mondal	91,829		
AITC gain from CPI(M)		Swing	{{{swing}}}	

=== 1972 ===
Kansari Halder of CPI won in 1972. Gangadhar Naskar of CPI(M) won in 1971, 1969, and 1967. Khagendra Kumar Roy Choudhury of CPI won in 1962.
