= Rajpur Sonarpur =

City in West Bengal, India

- City
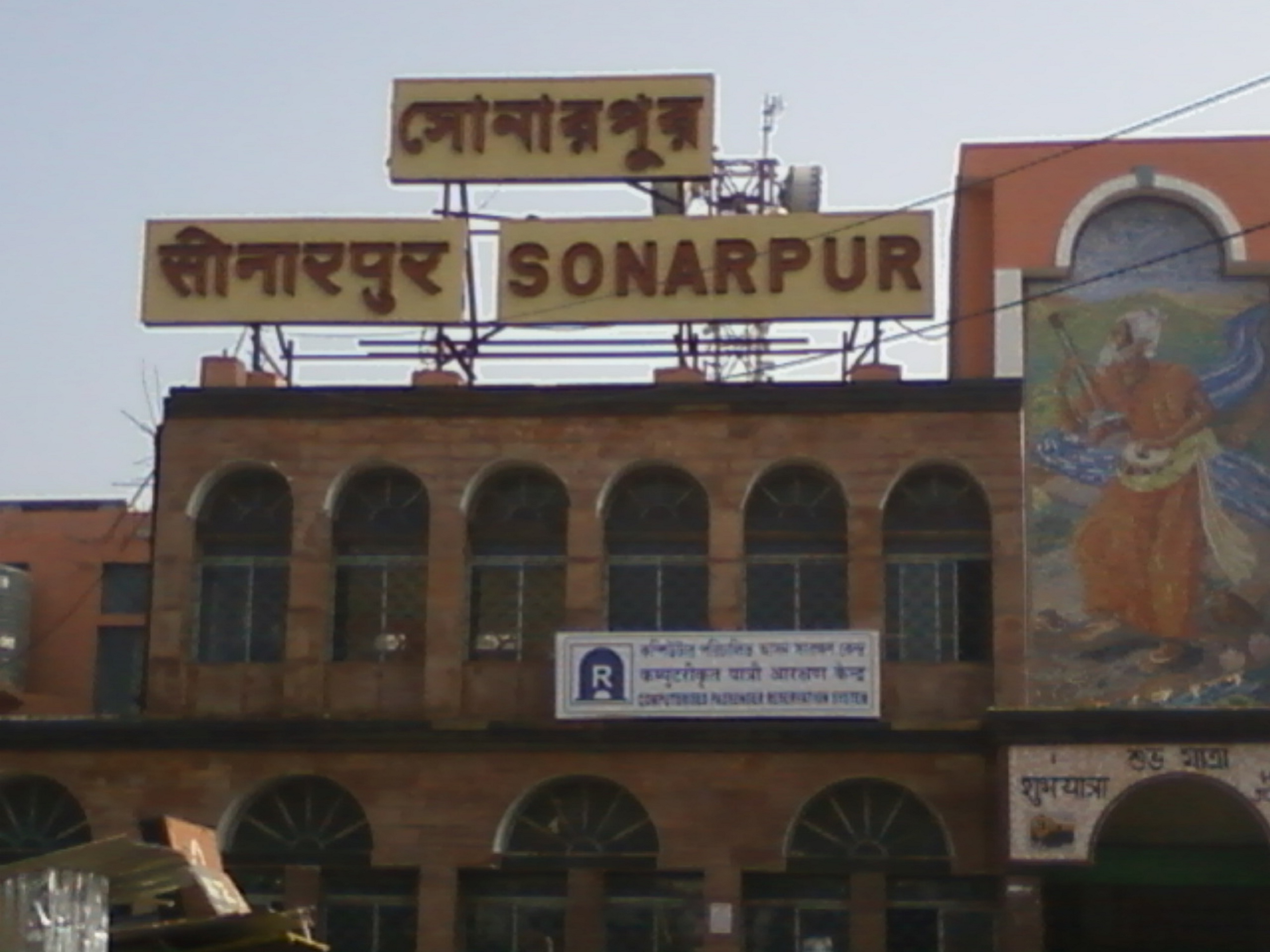
- Sonarpur Junction Railway Station
- Interactive map outlining Rajpur Sonarpur
- Location in West Bengal Location in India Location in Asia Location in Earth
- Coordinates: 22°26′27″N 88°25′29″E
- Country: India
- State: West Bengal
- Division: Presidency
- District: South 24 Parganas

Government
  - Type: Municipality
  - Body: Rajpur Sonarpur Municipality

Area
  - Total: 49.26 km^{2} (19.02 sq mi)
- Elevation: 9 m (30 ft)

Population (2011)
  - Total: 424,368
  - Density: 8,615/km^{2} (22,310/sq mi)

Demographics
  - Literacy: 90.14 per cent
  - Sex ratio: 970 ♂/♀

Languages
  - Official: Bengali
  - Additional official: English
- Time zone: UTC+5:30 (IST)
- PIN: 700070, 700084, 700094, 700096, 700103, 700145, 700146, 700147, 700148, 700149, 700150, 700151, 700152, 700153, 700154
- Telephone code: +91 33
- Vehicle registration: WB-19, WB-20, WB-95, WB-96, WB-97, WB-98
- Lok Sabha constituency: Jadavpur
- Vidhan Sabha constituency: Sonarpur Uttar, Sonarpur Dakshin
- Website: rajpursonarpurmunicipality.in

Rajpur Sonarpur (Bengali: [ɾɑːd͡ʒpuɾ soːnɑːɾpuɾ]) is a city and a municipality of South 24 Parganas district in the Indian state of West Bengal. It is a part of the area covered by Kolkata Metropolitan Development Authority (KMDA).

== History ==
Many janapadas grew up along the old Bhagirathi channel from the ancient times until around the 16th century: Kalighat, Boral, Rajpur, Harinavi, Mahinagar, Baruipur, Baharu, Jaynagar Majilpur, Chhatrabhog etc. Bipradas Pipilai's Manasavijaya, composed in 1495, mentions many places in this region. Chand Sadagar, a merchant character of the Manasavijaya, reached Baruipur, from Kalighat, through the old Bhagirathi channel. From there he proceeded towards Chhatrabhog, and then traveling through Hatiagarh pargana reached the open sea. Chaitanyadeva (1486–1534) also went through this route. Travelling by boat to Puri he halted at the village of Atisara, near Baruipur. His last stoppage in 24 Parganas was at Chhatrabhog. Chhatrabhog seems to have been an important river-port on the old Bhagirathi channel. Rama Chandra Khan, the zamindar of Chhatrabhog, helped Chaitanyadeva to continue with his journey.

The area was home to the feudatory landlords (zamindars). The name Rajpur has been thus derived from the Bengali words Rajar Puri to Rajpuri and in this form to the now Rajpur. Being on the banks of the Adi Ganga, Rajpur was one of the major locations of Bengal at that time. The proximity to Kolkata's southern district and being on the banks of Adi Ganga, which is just across the river made the place to be well connected. The old zamindar's house in Harinavi is like the Roy Choudhury's. The family stayed in Rajpur. The ancestral houses of Sarat Chandra Bose and Subhash Chandra Bose were at Kodalia, a neighbourhood in Rajpur. Both of them were members of the first 24 Parganas District Committee of the Congress Party, which was formed in 1921.

== Geography ==
Cities and towns in the northern part of Baruipur subdivision (including Sonarpur, Bhangar I & II CD blocks) in South 24 Parganas district.
M: municipal city/ town, CT: census town, R: rural/ urban centre, N: neighbourhood.
Owing to space constraints in the small map, the actual locations in a larger map may vary slightly.

=== Area overview ===
Baruipur subdivision is a rural subdivision with moderate levels of urbanization. 31.05% of the population lives in the urban areas and 68.95% lives in the rural areas. In the northern portion of the subdivision (shown in the map alongside) there are 10 census towns. The entire district is situated in the Ganges Delta and the northern part of the subdivision is a flat plain bordering the metropolis of Kolkata.

Note: The map alongside presents some of the notable locations in the subdivision. All places marked in the map are linked in the larger full screen map.

=== Location ===
Rajpur Sonarpur is located at 22°26′27″N 88°25′29″E. It has an average elevation of 9 metres (30 ft).

Danga and Ramchandrapur are adjacent to Rajpur Sonarpur on its south-eastern side, as per the map of the Sonarpur CD block in the District Census Handbook 2011 for the South 24 Parganas district.

Petua, Panchghara, Mallikpur and Hariharpur form a cluster of census towns in the Baruipur CD block, as per the map of the Baruipur CD block in the District Census Handbook 2011 for the South 24 Parganas district. This cluster has Rajpur Sonarpur on the east and Bidyadharpur on the north, both in the Sonarpur CD block, as per the map of the Sonarpur CD block in the District Census Handbook 2011 for South 24 Parganas district.

=== Climate ===
Köppen-Geiger climate classification system classifies its climate as tropical wet and dry (Aw).

Climate data for Rajpur Sonarpur
Month	Jan	Feb	Mar	Apr	May	Jun	Jul	Aug	Sep	Oct	Nov	Dec	Year
Mean daily maximum °C (°F)	25.4 (77.7)	27.7 (81.9)	31.4 (88.5)	33.1 (91.6)	33.4 (92.1)	32.3 (90.1)	30.7 (87.3)	30.8 (87.4)	31.2 (88.2)	30.8 (87.4)	28.1 (82.6)	25.1 (77.2)	30.0 (86.0)
Daily mean °C (°F)	19.9 (67.8)	22.7 (72.9)	27 (81)	29.3 (84.7)	30 (86)	29.5 (85.1)	28.5 (83.3)	28.6 (83.5)	28.5 (83.3)	27.5 (81.5)	23.5 (74.3)	20 (68)	26.3 (79.3)
Mean daily minimum °C (°F)	14.5 (58.1)	17.7 (63.9)	22.6 (72.7)	25.6 (78.1)	26.7 (80.1)	26.8 (80.2)	26.4 (79.5)	26.4 (79.5)	25.9 (78.6)	24.2 (75.6)	19 (66)	14.6 (58.3)	22.5 (72.6)
Average precipitation mm (inches)	14 (0.6)	17 (0.7)	20 (0.8)	34 (1.3)	96 (3.8)	244 (9.6)	323 (12.7)	322 (12.7)	321 (12.6)	172 (6.8)	30 (1.2)	1 (0.0)	1,594 (62.8)
Source: Climate-Data.org (altitude: 9 m)

== Demographics ==
=== Population ===
Historical population
Year	Pop.	±%
1901	10,713	—
1911	11,607	+8.3%
1921	11,412	−1.7%
1931	11,433	+0.2%
1941	13,614	+19.1%
1951	16,310	+19.8%
1961	24,812	+52.1%
1971	34,393	+38.6%
1981	43,985	+27.9%
1991	60,175	+36.8%
2001	336,707	+459.5%
2011	424,368	+26.0%
Source: Census of India

According to the 2011 Census of India, Rajpur Sonarpur had a total population of 424,368, of which 215,405 (50.76%) were males and 208,963 (49.24%) were females. It had a population density of 8,615 inhabitants per square kilometre (22,310/sq mi) with a sex ratio of 970 females for every 1000 males. There were 35,274 persons in the age range of 0 to 6 years which is 8.31% of the total population. The Scheduled Castes numbered 78,655 (18.53%) and the Scheduled Tribes numbered 2,340 (0.55%). The total number of literate persons was 350,721 (90.14% of the population over 6 years) out of which males numbered 183,918 (93.23% of the male population over 6 years) and females numbered 166,803 (86.96% of the female population over 6 years). Rajpur Sonarpur had a total of 106,604 households as per report released by 2011 Census of India.

=== Language ===
Languages of Rajpur Sonarpur (2011)
1. Bengali (96.7%)
2. Hindi (2.96%)
3. Urdu (0.35%)
4. Others (0.01%)

At the time of the 2011 Census of India, 96.68% of the population spoke Bengali, 2.96% Hindi and 0.35% Urdu as their first language.

=== Religion ===
Religion in Rajpur Sonarpur (2011)
Religion	Percent
Hinduism	89.34%
Islam	9.25%
Christianity	0.40%
Sikhism	0.10%
Buddhism	0.04%
Jainism	0.02%
Others or not stated	0.85%

According to the 2011 Census of India, 89.34% of the population is Hindu, 9.25% Muslim, 0.40% Christian, 0.10% Sikh, 0.04% Buddhist and 0.02% Jain. 0.85% did not state a religion in the census.

== Civic administration ==
=== Municipality ===
Rajpur Sonarpur Municipality covers an area of 49.26 km^{2} (19.02 sq mi). It has jurisdiction over the entire city of Rajpur Sonarpur. The municipality was established in 1876; 150 years ago. It is divided into 35 administrative wards. According to the 2022 municipal election, it is being controlled by the All India Trinamool Congress.

=== Police station ===
Sonarpur police station covers an area of 169.816 km^{2} (65.566 sq mi). It has jurisdiction over parts of the Rajpur Sonarpur Municipality, and the Sonarpur CD block.

=== CD block HQ ===
The headquarters of the Sonarpur CD block are located at Rajpur Sonarpur.

== Transport ==
Rajpur Sonarpur is on the State Highway 1.

Sonarpur Junction railway station is on the Sealdah–Namkhana line of the Kolkata Suburban Railway.

=== Commuters ===
With the electrification of the railways, suburban traffic has grown tremendously since the 1960s. As of 2005-06, more than 1.7 million (17 lakhs) commuters use the Kolkata Suburban Railway system daily. After the partition of India, refugees from erstwhile East Pakistan and Bangladesh had a strong impact on the development of urban areas in the periphery of Kolkata. The new immigrants depended on Kolkata for their livelihood, thus increasing the number of commuters. Eastern Railway runs 1,272 EMU trains daily.

== Education ==
- B.D.M International is an English-medium coeducational school. It was established in 1966 and has facilities for teaching from class I to class XII.
- Future Institute of Engineering and Management, established in 2001, offers diploma, undergraduate and postgraduate degree courses in Engineering and Technology and other allied fields.
- Harinavi DVAS High School is a Bengali-medium coeducational school. It was established in 1866 and has facilities for teaching from class V to class XII.
- Meghnad Saha Institute of Technology, established in 2001, offers diploma, undergraduate and postgraduate degree courses in Engineering and Technology and other allied fields.
- Netaji Subhash Engineering College, established in 1998, offers diploma, undergraduate and postgraduate degree courses in Engineering and Technology and other allied fields.
- Narendrapur Ramakrishna Mission Residential College, established in 1960, is affiliated with the University of Calcutta. It offers honours courses in Bengali, English, Sanskrit, history, political science, philosophy, economics, geography, education, mathematics and accounting & finance, and general degree courses in arts, science, and commerce.

== Healthcare ==
- Sonarpur Rural Hospital, with 25 beds, is the major government medical facility in the Rajpur Sonarpur.
- Indian Institute of Liver & Digestive Sciences (IILDS)

== Notable people ==
- Sayak Chakraborty, television actor
- Raj Kumar Mehra, cyclist
- Premendra Mitra, filmmaker and writer
