= Jadavpur Lok Sabha constituency =

Lok Sabha Constituency in West Bengal

Coordinates: 22°30′09″N 88°22′03″E

Jadavpur WB-22
- Lok Sabha constituency
- Interactive Map Outlining Jadavpur Lok Sabha Constituency

Constituency details
- Country: India
- Region: East India
- State: West Bengal
- Assembly constituencies: Baruipur Purba; Baruipur Paschim; Sonarpur Dakshin; Bhangar; Jadavpur; Sonarpur Uttar; Tollyganj
- Established: 1977–Present
- Total electors: 20,34,251
- Reservation: None

Member of Parliament
- 18th Lok Sabha
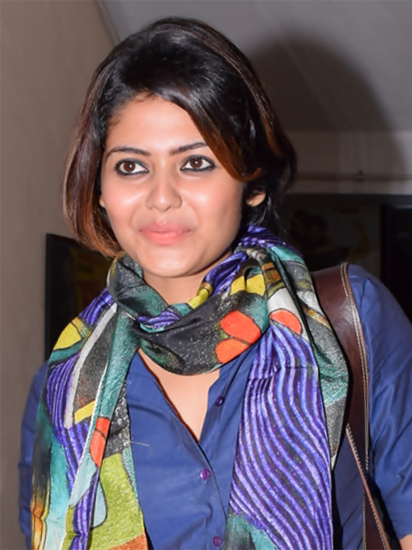
- Incumbent Saayoni Ghosh
- Party: NCPI
- Alliance: NDA
- Elected year: 2024

Jadavpur Lok Sabha constituency is one of the 543 Parliamentary constituencies in India. The constituency centres on Jadavpur in West Bengal. All the seven legislative assembly segments of No. 22 Jadavpur Lok Sabha constituency are in South 24 Parganas district.

Most Successful parties from Jadavpur Loksabha
1. Communist Party of India (Marxist) (5 times) (38.5%)
2. Trinamool Congress (6 times) (46.1%)
3. Indian National Congress (2 times) (15.4%)
4. 0.00%

== Assembly segments ==
Parliamentary constituencies in West Bengal - 1. Cooch Behar, 2. Alipurduars, 3. Jalpaiguri, 4. Darjeeling, 5. Raiganj, 6. Balurghat, 7. Maldaha Uttar, 8. Maldaha Dakshin, 9. Jangipur, 10. Baharampur, 11. Murshidabad, 12. Krishnanagar, 13. Ranaghat, 14. Bangaon, 15. Barrackpore, 16. Dum Dum, 17. Barasat, 18. Basirhat, 19. Jaynagar, 20. Mathurapur, 21. Diamond Harbour, 22. Jadavpur, 23. Kolkata Dakshin, 24. Kolkata Uttar, 25. Howrah, 26. Uluberia, 27. Serampore, 28. Hooghly, 29. Arambagh, 30. Tamluk, 31, Kanthi, 32. Ghatal, 33. Jhargram, 34. Medinipur, 35. Purulia, 36. Bankura, 37. Bishnupur, 38. Bardhaman Purba, 39. Bardhaman Durgapur, 40. Asansol, 41. Bolpur, 42. Birbhum

As per order of the Delimitation Commission in respect of the Delimitation of constituencies in the West Bengal, Jadavpur Lok Sabha constituency is composed of the following legislative assembly segments from 2009:

#	Name	District	MLA, from 2026	MLA's Party	2024 Lok Sabha Lead
137	Baruipur Purba (SC)	South 24 Parganas	Bivas Sardar	AITC	AITC
140	Baruipur Paschim	South 24 Parganas	Biman Banerjee	AITC	AITC
147	Sonarpur Dakshin	South 24 Parganas	Roopa Ganguly	BJP	AITC
148	Bhangar	South 24 Parganas	Nawsad Siddique	Indian Secular Front	AITC
150	Jadavpur	South 24 Parganas	Sarbori Mukherjee	BJP	AITC
151	Sonarpur Uttar	South 24 Parganas	Debasish Dhar	BJP	AITC
152	Tollygunge	South 24 Parganas	Papiya Adhikari	BJP	AITC

== Members of Parliament ==
Year	Member	Party
till 1977 : Constituency did not exist
1977	Somnath Chatterjee	Communist Party of India (Marxist)
1980	Somnath Chatterjee	Communist Party of India (Marxist)
1984	Mamata Banerjee	Indian National Congress
1989	Malini Bhattacharya	Communist Party of India (Marxist)
1991	Malini Bhattacharya	Communist Party of India (Marxist)
1996	Krishna Bose	Indian National Congress
1998	Krishna Bose	Trinamool Congress
1999	Krishna Bose	Trinamool Congress
2004	Sujan Chakraborty	Communist Party of India (Marxist)
2009	Kabir Suman	Trinamool Congress
2014	Sugata Bose	Trinamool Congress
2019	Mimi Chakraborty	Trinamool Congress
2024	Saayoni Ghosh	Trinamool Congress
2026 (Note: Switched to NCPI as part of AITC Rebels in Lok Sabha.)	Saayoni Ghosh	Nationalist Citizens Party of India

== Election results ==
Vote share of Winning candidates
2024	45.83%
2019	47.91%
2014	45.83%
2009	49.84%
2004	49.60%
1999	48.97%
1998	48.90%
1996	47.40%
1991	46.82%
1989	50.19%
1984	50.87%
1980	59.99%
1977	68.01%

=== 2024 ===
2024 Indian general elections: Jadavpur
Party	Candidate	Votes	%	±%
AITC	Saayoni Ghosh	717,899	45.83	▼2.08
BJP	Anirban Ganguly	459,698	29.35	▲1.99
CPI(M)	Srijan Bhattacharya	258,712	16.59	▼4.45
AISF	Nur Alam Khan	83,362	5.32	New entry
Independent	Ranjit Kumar Mandal	13,030	0.83	
None of the Above	None of the Above	7,415	0.47	
Majority		258,201	16.48	
Turnout		15,66,162	77.53	
AITC hold		Swing		

=== 2019 ===
2019 Indian general elections: Jadavpur
Party	Candidate	Votes	%	±%
AITC	Mimi Chakraborty	688,472	47.91	+1.99
BJP	Anupam Hazra	393,233	27.36	+15.14
CPI(M)	Bikash Ranjan Bhattacharya	302,264	21.04	−15.05
Independent	Kartik Kayal	9,378	0.65	
PDS	Anuradha Putatunda	5,549	0.39	
BSP	Bimal Krishna Mandal	5,114	0.36	
SUCI(C)	Sujata Banerjee	4,354	0.30	
Independent	Mangal Kumar Sardar	3,475	0.24	
Independent	Kartick Naskar	2,554	0.18	
Independent	Atanu Chatterjee	2,345	0.16	
BNARP	Rupa Khan	1,667	0.12	
MPOI	Dr Nazrul Islam	1,605	0.11	
RJP	Gopal Naskar	1,343	0.09	
None of the Above	None Of The Above	15,541	1.08	−0.15
Majority		295,239	20.54	
Turnout		1,436,894	79.09	
AITC hold		Swing	-8.57	

=== 2014 ===
2014 Indian general elections: Jadavpur
Party	Candidate	Votes	%	±%
AITC	Dr. Sugata Bose	584,244	45.83	−4.01
CPI(M)	Dr. Sujan Chakraborty	4,59,041	36.01	−8.64
BJP	Dr. Sarup Prasad Ghosh	1,55,511	12.20	+10.30
INC	Samir Aich	26,344	2.07	
SUCI(C)	Dr. Asok Kumar Samanta	11,317	0.89	
BSP	Sandhya Mandal	3,945	0.31	−0.04
Independent	Mangal Kumar Sardar	3,406	0.27	
Independent	Susanta Kumar Naskar	3,067	0.24	
Independent	Shamali Das	2,885	0.23	
Independent	Kartik Kayal	2,837	0.22	
RJP	Hasibul Islam Mir	1,464	0.11	
BMP	Pintu Sanpui	1,340	0.11	
Independent	Ashok Kumar Shaw	1,294	0.10	
None of the Above	None Of The Above	15,667	1.23	−−−
Majority		1,25,203	9.82	+5.70
Turnout		12,72,362	79.74	−1.74
AITC hold		Swing	+5.32	

=== 2009 ===
General Election, 2009: Jadavpur
Party	Candidate	Votes	%	±%
AITC	Kabir Suman	540,667	49.84	+8.03
CPI(M)	Dr. Sujan Chakraborty	484,400	44.65	−4.88
BJP	Sanat Bhattacharya	25,331	1.90	
Independent	Rama Bose	8,490	0.64	
PDS	Saifuddin Choudhury	6,141	0.46	
BSP(K)	Pintu Sanpui	5,736	0.43	
BSP	Sandhaya Mondal	4,609	0.35	−0.33
Independent	Fakir Mahammad Laskar	3,941	0.30	
Independent	Kamalesh Das	3,102	0.23	
Independent	Tushar Kanti Das	2,416	0.18	
Majority		56,267	4.22	−4.55
Turnout		1,084,833	81.47	
AITC gain from CPI(M)		Swing	-6.55	

=== 2004 ===
General Election, 2004: Jadavpur
Party	Candidate	Votes	%	±%
CPI(M)	Dr. Sujan Chakraborty	505,396	49.60	
AITC	Krishna Bose	415,728	40.80	
INC	Omprakash Mishra	66,121	6.46	
Independent	Banasree Chakraborty	10,286	1.00	
BSP	Arabinda Halder	6,875	0.67	
INL	Anisur Rahaman	6,374	0.62	
AIUDF	Tapas Kumar Howalder	3,235	0.31	
Independent	Tapan Sarkar	2,603	0.25	
Independent	Badan Bairagi	2,320	0.22	
Independent	Arup Ghosh	1,710	0.16	
Independent	Jit Narayan Singh	1,667	0.16	
Majority		89,668	8.77	
Turnout		10,22,315		
CPI(M) gain from AITC		Swing		

=== 1999 ===
General Election, 1999: Jadavpur
Party	Candidate	Votes	%	±%
AITC	Krishna Bose	485,366	48.97	
CPI(M)	Kanti Ganguly	418,601	41.60	
INC	Dr. Maya Ghosh	79,672	7.90	
Independent	Tapan Roy Chowdhury	3,528	4.00	
BSP	Asalata Majumder	1,810	2.00	
Independent	Ram Chandra Kayal	964	1.00	
Independent	Jiban Bairagi	748	1.00	
Independent	Nuton Mondal	509	1.00	
Majority		66,765	6.60	
Turnout		10,05,286	71.6	
AITC hold		Swing		

=== 1998 ===
General Election, 1998: Jadavpur
Party	Candidate	Votes	%	±%
AITC	Krishna Bose	534,338	48.90	
CPI(M)	Malini Bhattacharya	436,137	40.90	
INC	Ram Pyare Ram	91,407	8.60	
Independent	Sandhya Mandal	3,568	0.30	
BSP	Nitai Roy	2,753	0.30	
Independent	Abu Siddique Laskar	1,458	0.10	
Independent	Md Aslam	1,370	0.10	
Independent	Biswanath Paul	1,158	0.10	
Majority		98,201	7.3	
Turnout		1,067,448	77.4	
AITC gain from INC		Swing		

=== 1996 ===
General Election, 1996: Jadavpur
Party	Candidate	Votes	%	±%
INC	Krishna Bose	499,254	47.40	
CPI(M)	Malini Bhattacharya	486,216	46.20	
BJP	Uttam Bose	52,470	5.00	
SS	Ardhendu Sen	5,203	0.5	
Independent	Abdul Samad Sardar	2,309	0.20	
INL	Gharami Yusuf	1,910	0.20	
Independent	Sunil Guha	1,790	0.20	
Independent	Ranjit Dutta	1,678	0.20	
Independent	Ram Sagar Roy	860	0.10	
Independent	Anup Chaterjee	777	0.10	
Independent	Murari Mohan Naskar	660	0.10	
Majority		13,038	1.2%	
Turnout		1,075,315	81.9%	
INC gain from CPI(M)		Swing		

=== 1991 ===
1991 Indian general election: Jadavpur
Party	Candidate	Votes	%	±%
CPI(M)	Malini Bhattacharya	398,896	46.82	
INC	Santosh Bhattacharya	348,595	40.92	
BJP	Uttam Bose	87,859	10.31	
IND	Sudhir Bhattacherjee	4,538	0.53	
IND	Jobed Losker	3,395	0.40	
JP	Vinay Kaushik	2,607	0.31	
BSP	Sandhya Mandal	2,572	0.30	
HSS	Jatindra Nath Biswas	1,296	0.15	
IND	Kalidas Mondal	1,283	0.15	
DDP	Shyam Sunder Thakur	919	0.11	
Majority		50,301	5.90	
Turnout		867,072	73.90	
CPI(M) hold		Swing		

=== 1989 ===
1989 Indian general election: Jadavpur
Party	Candidate	Votes	%	±%
CPI(M)	Malini Bhattacharya	441,188	50.19	
INC	Mamata Banerjee	410,288	46.67	
BJP	Uttam Basu	9,874	1.12	
IUML	Laskar Jabed Ali	7,994	0.91	
IND	Tarakeswar Samajpati	2,716	0.31	
IND	Aparna Mandal	2,652	0.30	
IND	Sewjee Ram	1,300	0.15	
IND	Rabindra Nath Das	1,134	0.13	
IND	Kanai Bera	1,036	0.12	
DDP	Hari Sankar Sah	858	0.10	
Majority		30,900	3.52	
Turnout		892,984	78.88	
Swing to CPI(M) from INC		Swing		

=== 1984 ===
1984 Indian general election: Jadavpur
Party	Candidate	Votes	%	±%
INC	Mamata Banerjee	331,618	50.87	
CPI(M)	Somnath Chatterjee	311,958	47.85	
IC(S)	Sakti Sarkar	5,993	0.92	
IND	Rajanath Prasad	2,336	0.36	
Majority		19,660	3.02	
Turnout		666,155	76.42	
Swing to INC from CPI(M)		Swing		

=== 1980 ===
1980 Indian general election: Jadavpur
Party	Candidate	Votes	%	±%
CPI(M)	Somnath Chatterjee	309,094	59.99	
INC(I)	Sachinath Mitra	162,979	31.63	
JP	Haripada Bharati	31,846	6.18	
JP(S)	Abdul Mannan Khan	6,763	1.31	
IND	Nadyananda Sinha	1,778	0.35	
IND	Ganesh Chandra Mukherjee	1,492	0.29	
IND	Karuna Nidhan Roy	1,291	0.25	
Majority		146,115	28.36	
Turnout		527,037	66.21	
CPI(M) hold		Swing		

=== 1977 ===
1977 Indian general election: Jadavpur
Party	Candidate	Votes	%	±%
CPI(M)	Somnath Chatterjee	236,085	68.01	
CPI	Mohammad Elias	97,450	28.07	
IND	Biren Roy	5,852	1.69	
IND	Nihar Banerjee	5,360	1.54	
IND	Dhuba Chakraborty	1,605	0.46	
IND	Nitya Nanda Singh	792	0.23	
Majority		138,635	39.94	
Turnout		356,636	57.13	
CPI(M) win (new seat)				

== See also ==
- Jadavpur
- List of constituencies of the Lok Sabha
