= Maipit =

- Village
- Location in West Bengal Location in India
- Coordinates: 21°55′07″N 88°32′53″E
- Country: India
- State: West Bengal
- District: South 24 Parganas
- CD block: Kultali

Area
  - Total: 5.79 km^{2} (2.24 sq mi)
- Elevation: 7 m (23 ft)

Population (2011)
  - Total: 5,615
  - Density: 970/km^{2} (2,510/sq mi)

Languages
  - Official: Bengali
  - Additional official: English
- Time zone: UTC+5:30 (IST)
- PIN: 743383
- Telephone code: +91 3218
- Vehicle registration: WB-19 to WB-22, WB-95 to WB-99
- Lok Sabha constituency: Jaynagar (SC)
- Vidhan Sabha constituency: Kultali (SC)
- Website: www.s24pgs.gov.in

Maipit is a village and a gram panchayat within the jurisdiction of the Kultali police station in the Kultali CD block in the Baruipur subdivision of the South 24 Parganas district in the Indian state of West Bengal.

== Geography ==
Cities and towns in the southern part of Baruipur subdivision (including Baruipur, Jaynagar I & II, Kultali CD blocks) in South 24 Parganas district
M: municipal city/ town, CT: census town, R: rural/ urban centre, N: neighbourhood, H: historical place/ religious centre
Owing to space constraints in the small map, the actual locations in a larger map may vary slightly

=== Area overview ===
Baruipur subdivision is a rural subdivision with moderate levels of urbanization. 31.05% of the population lives in the urban areas and 68.95% lives in the rural areas. In the southern portion of the subdivision (shown in the map alongside) there are 20 census towns. The entire district is situated in the Ganges Delta and the southern part is covered by the Baruipur-Jaynagar Plain. Archaeological excavations at Dhosa and Tilpi, on the bank of the Piyali River indicate the existence of human habitation around 2,000 years ago.

Note: The map alongside presents some of the notable locations in the subdivision. All places marked in the map are linked in the larger full screen map.

=== Location ===
Maipit is located at 21°55′18″N 88°32′41″E. It has an average elevation of 7 metres (23 ft).

== Demographics ==
According to the 2011 Census of India, Maipit had a total population of 5,615, of which 2,962 (53%) were males and 2,653 (47%) were females. There were 759 persons in the age range of 0 to 6 years. The total number of literates in Maipit was 3,778 (77.80% of the population over 6 years).

== Civic administration ==
=== Police station ===
Maipith Coastal police station was established on 10 September 2009. It covers an area of 131.875 km^{2} (50.917 sq mi). It has jurisdiction over parts of the Kultali CD block. The coastal police stations were formed with the objective of effective policing of the remote areas of the Sundarbans. The police has regular river patrols.

== Transport ==
A short stretch of local roads link Maipit to the Jaynagar-Jamtala Road.

Jaynagar Majilpur railway station is located nearby.

== Education ==
Baikunthapur High School is a Bengali-medium coeducational institution established in 1943. It has arrangements for teaching from class V to XII. It has a library with 2,247 books, 10 computers for teaching and learning purposes and a play ground.

== Healthcare ==
There is a primary health centre, with 6 beds, at Maipit.
