= Radhaballabhpur =

- Village
- Location in West Bengal Location in India
- Coordinates: 22.0471°N 88.5420°E
- Country: India
- State: West Bengal
- District: South 24 Parganas
- CD Block: Jaynagar II

Area
  - Total: 12.20 km^{2} (4.71 sq mi)
- Elevation: 8 m (26 ft)

Population (2011)
  - Total: 14,884
  - Density: 1,220/km^{2} (3,160/sq mi)

Languages
  - Official: Bengali
  - Additional official: English
- Time zone: UTC+5:30 (IST)
- PIN: 743349
- Telephone code: +91 3218
- Vehicle registration: WB-19 to WB-22, WB-95 to WB-99
- Lok Sabha constituency: Jaynagar (SC)
- Vidhan Sabha constituency: Kultali (SC)
- Website: www.s24pgs.gov.in

Radhaballabhpur is a village within the jurisdiction of the Jaynagar Majilpur police station in the Jaynagar II CD block in the Baruipur subdivision of the South 24 Parganas district in the Indian state of West Bengal.

== Geography ==
Radhaballabhpur is located at 22°02′50″N 88°32′31″E. It has an average elevation of 8 metres (26 ft).

== Demographics ==
As per 2011 Census of India, Radhaballabhpur had a total population of 14,884.

== Transport ==
A short stretch of local roads link Radhaballabhpur to the Jaynagar-Jamtala Road.

Jaynagar Majilpur railway station is located nearby.

== Healthcare ==
Sri Ramakrishna Rural Hospital, with 30 beds, at Nimpith, is the major government medical facility in the Jaynagar II CD block.
