= Sonatikri =

- Village
- Location in West Bengal Location in India
- Coordinates: 22.0230°N 88.5033°E
- Country: India
- State: West Bengal
- District: South 24 Parganas
- CD Block: Jaynagar II

Area
  - Total: 15.86 km^{2} (6.12 sq mi)
- Elevation: 8 m (26 ft)

Population (2011)
  - Total: 15,536
  - Density: 979.6/km^{2} (2,537/sq mi)

Languages
  - Official: Bengali
  - Additional official: English
- Time zone: UTC+5:30 (IST)
- PIN: 743349
- Telephone code: +91 3218
- Vehicle registration: WB-19 to WB-22, WB-95 to WB-99
- Lok Sabha constituency: Jaynagar (SC)
- Vidhan Sabha constituency: Kultali (SC)
- Website: www.s24pgs.gov.in

Sonatikri is a village within the jurisdiction of the Jaynagar Majilpur police station in the Jaynagar II CD block in the Baruipur subdivision of the South 24 Parganas district in the Indian state of West Bengal.

== Geography ==
Sonatikri is located at 22°01′23″N 88°30′12″E. It has an average elevation of 8 metres (26 ft).

== Demographics ==
As per 2011 Census of India, Sonatikri had a total population of 15,536.

== Transport ==
A short stretch of local roads link Sonatikri to the Jaynagar-Jamtala Road.

Jaynagar Majilpur railway station is located nearby.

== Healthcare ==
There is a primary health centre, with 10 beds, at Nalgora (PO Sonatikri).
