= Nirad Kumar Saha =

Indian politician

Nirad Kumar Saha was an Indian politician, belonging to the Indian National Congress. He was elected to the Joynagar seat of the West Bengal Legislative Assembly in a by-election held June 6, 1972. The by-election had been called after the death of legislator Prosun Kumar Ghosh. Saha obtained 25,053 votes (80.25%), in an election that was boycotted by the left-wing alliance. Saha lost the Joynagar seat in the 1977 West Bengal Legislative Assembly election, finishing in third place with 11,063 votes (19.36%).
