= Jamtala =

- Village
- Location in West Bengal Location in India
- Coordinates: 22.1166°N 88.5704°E
- Country: India
- State: West Bengal
- District: South 24 Parganas
- CD block: Kultali

Area
  - Total: 4.13 km^{2} (1.59 sq mi)
- Elevation: 7 m (23 ft)

Population (2011)
  - Total: 4,495
  - Density: 1,090/km^{2} (2,820/sq mi)

Languages
  - Official: Bengali
  - Additional official: English
- Time zone: UTC+5:30 (IST)
- PIN: 743348
- Telephone code: +91 3218
- Vehicle registration: WB-19 to WB-22, WB-95 to WB-99
- Lok Sabha constituency: Jaynagar (SC)
- Vidhan Sabha constituency: Kultali (SC)
- Website: www.s24pgs.gov.in

Jamtala is a village within the jurisdiction of the Kultali police station in the Kultali CD block in the Baruipur subdivision of the South 24 Parganas district in the Indian state of West Bengal.

== Geography ==
Cities and towns in the southern part of Baruipur subdivision (including Baruipur, Jaynagar I & II, Kultali CD blocks) in South 24 Parganas district
M: municipal city/ town, CT: census town, R: rural/ urban centre, N: neighbourhood, H: historical place/ religious centre
Places linked with coastal activity are marked in blue
Owing to space constraints in the small map, the actual locations in a larger map may vary slightly

=== Area overview ===
Baruipur subdivision is a rural subdivision with moderate levels of urbanization. 31.05% of the population lives in the urban areas and 68.95% lives in the rural areas. In the southern portion of the subdivision (shown in the map alongside) there are 20 census towns. The entire district is situated in the Ganges Delta and the southern part is covered by the Baruipur-Jaynagar Plain. Archaeological excavations at Dhosa and Tilpi, on the bank of the Piyali River indicate the existence of human habitation around 2,000 years ago.

Note: The map alongside presents some of the notable locations in the subdivision. All places marked in the map are linked in the larger full screen map.

=== Location ===
Jamtala is located at 22°07′00″N 88°34′13″E. It has an average elevation of 7 metres (23 ft).

== Demographics ==
According to the 2011 Census of India, Jamtala had a total population of 4,495, of which 2,294 (51%) were males and 2,201 (49%) were females. There were 536 persons in the age range of 0 to 6 years. The total number of literate persons in Jamtala was 3,063 (77.37% of the population over 6 years).

== Civic administration ==
=== CD block HQ ===
The map of the CD block Kultali on the page number 749 in the District Census Handbook 2011 for the South 24 Parganas district shows the CD block headquarters as being located in Jamtala.

== Transport ==
Jaynagar-Jamtala Road links Jamtala to the State Highway 1.

Jaynagar Majilpur railway station is located nearby.

== Education ==
Jamtala Bhagaban Chandra Higher Secondary School is a coeducational higher secondary school.

== Healthcare ==
Jaynagar Rural Hospital, with 25 beds, at Jamtala, is the major government medical facility in the Kultali CD block.
