= Bijaynagar =

- Village
- Location in West Bengal Location in India
- Coordinates: 22.1820°N 88.4610°E
- Country: India
- State: West Bengal
- District: South 24 Parganas
- CD Block: Jaynagar II

Area
  - Total: 1.49 km^{2} (0.58 sq mi)
- Elevation: 8 m (26 ft)

Population (2011)
  - Total: 6,274
  - Density: 4,210/km^{2} (10,900/sq mi)

Languages
  - Official: Bengali
  - Additional official: English
- Time zone: UTC+5:30 (IST)
- PIN: 743338
- Telephone code: +91 3218
- Vehicle registration: WB-19 to WB-22, WB-95 to WB-99
- Lok Sabha constituency: Jaynagar (SC)
- Vidhan Sabha constituency: Jaynagar (SC)
- Website: www.s24pgs.gov.in

Bijaynagar is a village within the jurisdiction of the Jaynagar Majilpur police station in the Jaynagar II CD block in the Baruipur subdivision of the South 24 Parganas district in the Indian state of West Bengal.

== Geography ==
Bijaynagar is located at 22°10′55″N 88°27′40″E. It has an average elevation of 8 metres (26 ft).

== Demographics ==
As per 2011 Census of India, Bijaynagar had a total population of 6,274.

== Transport ==
A short stretch of local roads link Bijaynagar to the State Highway 1.

Baharu railway station is located nearby.

== Healthcare ==
Sri Ramakrishna Rural Hospital, with 30 beds, at Nimpith, is the major government medical facility in the Jaynagar II CD block.
