= 1972 Joynagar by-election =

A by-election was held on June 6, 1972 for the Joynagar seat of the West Bengal Legislative Assembly. The by-election had been called after the death of the incumbent Indian National Congress legislator Prosun Kumar Ghosh.

The left-wing alliance boycotted the by-election. It was thus an easy win for the Indian National Congress, which fielded Dr. Nirad Kumar Saha as its candidate.

June 6, 1972 by-election: Joynagar constituency
Party	Candidate	Votes	%	±%
INC	Nirad Kumar Saha	25,053	80.25%	+28.65
Independent	Molla Haji Mokshedu Rehman	4,575	14.66%	
Independent	Samarendra Ganguly	792	2.54%	
Independent	Dr. Zahrul Islam	300	0.96%	
INC(O)	Sunil Bhattacharya	298	0.95%	
Independent	Debrakhi Bhattacharya	200	0.64%	
Turnout		32.029	37.79%	−31.41
INC hold		Swing		

There were 811 invalid votes.
