= Kalinagar (disambiguation) =

Kalinagar is a town and a nagar panchayat in Philibhit district in Uttar Pradesh, India. It may also refer to:

- Kalinagar, North 24 Parganas, a village in North 24 Parganas district, in West Bengal, India
- Kalinagar, Jaynagar
- Kalinagar Mahavidyalaya, a degree college
