= Jaynagar II =

Community Development Block in West Bengal, India

- Community Development Block
- Location of Jaynagar II community development block in South 24 Parganas district
- Coordinates: 22.1751965°N 88.4200762°E
- Country: India
- State: West Bengal
- Division: Presidency
- District: South 24 Parganas
- Subdivision: Baruipur
- Headquarters: Nimpith

Government
  - Gram Panchayats: Baishata, Beledurganagar, Chuprijhara, Futigoda, Gardoani, Manirtat, Mayahauri, Mayda, Nalgora, Sahajadapur
  - Lok Sabha constituencies: Jaynagar
  - Vidhan Sabha constituencies: Jaynagar, Kultali

Area
  - Total: 186.25 km^{2} (71.91 sq mi)

Population (2011)
  - Total: 252,164
  - Density: 1,353.9/km^{2} (3,506.6/sq mi)
  - Urban: 12,380

Demographics
  - Literacy: 69.71 per cent
  - Sex ratio: 957 ♂/♀

Languages
  - Official: Bengali
  - Additional official: English
- Time zone: UTC+05:30 (IST)
- Website: s24pgs.gov.in

Jaynagar II is a community development block that forms an administrative division in Baruipur subdivision of South 24 Parganas district in the Indian state of West Bengal.

== Geography ==

The Jaynagar II CD block is located at 22°10′31″N 88°25′12″E. It has an average elevation of 8 metres (26 ft).

The Jaynagar II CD block is bounded by the Jaynagar I CD block in the north, the Kultali CD block in the east and south, the Mathurapur II, Mathurapur I and Mandirbazar CD blocks in the west.

The South 24 Parganas district is divided into two distinct physiographic zones: the marine-riverine delta in the north and the marine delta zone in the south. As the sea receded southwards, in the sub-recent geological period, a large low-lying plain got exposed. Both tidal inflows and the rivers have been depositing sediments in this plain. The periodical collapse of both the natural levees and man-made embankments speed up the process of filling up of the depressions containing brackish water wetlands. The marine delta in the south is formed of interlacing tidal channels. As non-saline water for irrigation is scarce, agriculture is monsoon dominated. Some parts of the wetlands are still preserved for raising fish.

The Jaynagar II CD block has an area of 186.25 km^{2} (71.91 sq mi). It has 1 panchayat samity, 10 gram panchayats, 122 gram sansads (village councils), 49 mouzas and 49 inhabited villages, as per the District Statistical Handbook for the South Twenty-four Parganas district. Jaynagar and Kultali police stations serve this CD Block. Headquarters of this CD block is at Nimpith.

The Jaynagar II CD block has 42 km of embankments. Embankments raised along rivers are of critical importance for the safety of lives and protection of crops, against daily tides and tidal surges.

The Gram Panchayats of Jaynagar II CD block/panchayat samiti are: Baishata, Beledurganagar, Chuprijhara, Futigoda, Gardoani, Manirtat, Mayahauri, Mayda, Nalgora and Sahajadapur.

== Demographics ==
=== Population ===
According to the 2011 Census of India, the Jaynagar II CD block had a total population of 252,164, of which 239,784 were rural and 12,380 were urban. There were 128,858 (51%) males and 123,306 (49%) females. There were 38,872 persons in the age range of 0 to 6 years. The Scheduled Castes numbered 85,587 (33.94%) and the Scheduled Tribes numbered 1,046 (0.41%).

According to the 2001 Census of India, the Jaynagar II CD block had a total population of 209,136, out of which 108,059 were males and 101,077 were females. The Jaynagar II CD block registered a population growth of 17.93 per cent during the 1991–2001 decade. Decadal growth for the South 24 Parganas district was 20.89 per cent. Decadal growth in West Bengal was 17.84 per cent. The Scheduled Castes at 78,652 formed over one-third the population. The Scheduled Tribes numbered 3,407.

Census Towns in the Jaynagar II CD block (2011 census figures in brackets): Nimpith (8,014) and Tulshighata (4,366).

Large villages (with 4,000+ population) in the Jaynagar II CD block (2011 census figures in brackets): Kalinagar (6,600), Bijaynagar (6,274), Khaiyamara (10,804), Mayahauri (19,604), Gordoani (20,984), Mallar Chak (4,928), Jautia (5,749), Baishata (6,245), Pat Pukur (5,290), Purba Raghunathpur (4,575), Beladurganagar (6,106), Rupnagar (8,561), Taranagar (4,340), Karibaria (4,971), Manirtala (17,711), Radhaballabhpur (14,884), Nalgora (10,373), Sonatikri (15,536), Bhubankhali (6,949) and Chuprijhara (11,738).

Other villages in the Jaynagar II CD block include (2011 census figures in brackets): Phutigoda (2,654), Sahajadapur (2,383) and Mayda (2,736).

=== Literacy ===
According to the 2011 census, the total number of literate persons in the Jaynagar II CD block was 148,676 (69.71% of the population over 6 years) out of which males numbered 84,612 (77.48% of the male population over 6 years) and females numbered 64,064 (61.55% of the female population over 6 years). The gender disparity (the difference between female and male literacy rates) was 15.94%.

According to the 2011 Census of India, literacy in the South 24 Parganas district was 77.51 Literacy in West Bengal was 77.08% in 2011. Literacy in India in 2011 was 74.04%.

According to the 2001 Census of India, the Jaynagar II CD block had a total literacy of 59.23 per cent for the 6+ age group. While male literacy was 72.08 per cent female literacy was 45.35 per cent. South 24 Parganas district had a total literacy of 69.45 per cent, male literacy being 79.19 per cent and female literacy being 59.01 per cent.

See also – List of West Bengal districts ranked by literacy rate

Literacy in CD blocks of
South 24 Parganas district
Alipore Sadar subdivision
Bishnupur I – 78.33%
Bishnupur II – 81.37%
Budge Budge I – 80.57%
Budge Budge II – 79.13%
Thakurpukur Maheshtala – 83.54%
Baruipur subdivision
Baruipur – 76.46%
Bhangar I – 72.06%
Bhangar II – 74.49%
Jaynagar I – 73.17%
Jaynagar II – 69.71%
Kultali – 69.37%
Sonarpur – 79.70%
Canning subdivision
Basanti – 68.32%
Canning I – 70.76%
Canning II – 66.51%
Gosaba – 78.98%
Diamond Harbour subdivision
Diamond Harbour I – 75.72%
Diamond Harbour II – 76.91%
Falta – 77.17%
Kulpi – 75.49%
Magrahat I – 73.82%
Magrahat II – 77.41%
Mandirbazar – 75.89%
Mathurapur I – 73.93%
Mathurapur II – 77.77%
Kakdwip subdivision
Kakdwip – 77.93%
Namkhana – 85.72
Patharpratima – 82.11%
Sagar – 84.21%
Source: 2011 Census: CD Block Wise
Primary Census Abstract Data

=== Language ===
Languages of Jaynagar II CD block (2011)
1. Bengali (99.9%)
2. Hindi (0.03%)
3. Urdu (0.02%)
4. Others (0.01%)

At the time of the 2011 census, 99.94% of the population spoke Bengali, 0.03% Hindi and 0.02% Urdu as their first language.

=== Religion ===
Religion in Jaynagar II CD block (2011)
Islam	51.23%
Hinduism	48.03%
Christianity	0.55%
Other or not stated	0.19%

In the 2011 Census of India, Muslims numbered 131,704 and formed 51.23% of the population in the Jaynagar II CD block. Hindus numbered 121,591 and formed 48.03% of the population. Others numbered 1,869 and formed 0.74% of the population. Among the others, Christians numbered 1,381. In 2001, Hindus and Muslims were 51.47% and 47.84% of the population respectively, whiles Christians were 0.53% of the population.

The proportion of Hindus in the South Twenty-four Parganas district has declined from 76.0% in 1961 to 63.2% in 2011. The proportion of Muslims in South Twenty-four Parganas district has increased from 23.4% to 35.6% during the same period. Christians formed 0.8% in 2011.

== Rural poverty ==
As per the Human Development Report for the South 24 Parganas district, published in 2009, in the Jaynagar II CD block the percentage of households below poverty line was 42.60%. The poverty rates were very high in the Sundarbans settlements with all the thirteen CD blocks registering poverty ratios above 30% and eight CD blocks had more than 40% of the population in the BPL category. The Sundarban region remains the most backward region in terms of quality of life. As per rural household survey in 2005, the proportion of households in South 24 Parganas with poverty rates below poverty line was 34.11%, way above the state and national poverty ratios.

== Economy ==
=== Livelihood ===
Livelihood
in Jaynagar II CD block
1. Cultivators (15.9%)
2. Agricultural labourers (36.4%)
3. Household industries (13.1%)
4. Other Workers (34.6%)

In the Jaynagar II CD block in 2011, among the class of total workers, cultivators numbered 14,804 and formed 15.88%, agricultural labourers numbered 33,952 and formed 36.41%, household industry workers numbered 12,219 and formed 13.10% and other workers numbered 24,467 and formed 34.60%. Total workers numbered 93,240 and formed 36.98% of the total population, and non-workers numbered 158,924 and formed 63.02% of the population.

The District Human Development Report points out that in the CD blocks of the region situated in the close proximity of the Kolkata metropolis, overwhelming majority are involved in the non-agricultural sector for their livelihood. On the other hand, in the Sundarbans settlements, overwhelming majority are dependent on agriculture. In the intermediate region, there is again predominance of the non-agricultural sector. Though the region is not very close to Kolkata, many places are well connected and some industrial/ economic development has taken place.

Note: In the census records a person is considered a cultivator, if the person is engaged in cultivation/ supervision of land owned by self/ government/ institution. When a person who works on another person's land for wages in cash or kind or share, is regarded as an agricultural labourer. Household industry is defined as an industry conducted by one or more members of the family within the household or village, and one that does not qualify for registration as a factory under the Factories Act. Other workers are persons engaged in some economic activity other than cultivators, agricultural labourers and household workers. It includes factory, mining, plantation, transport and office workers, those engaged in business and commerce, teachers, entertainment artistes and so on.

=== Infrastructure ===
There are 47 inhabited villages in the Jaynagar II CD block, as per the District Census Handbook, South Twenty-four Parganas, 2011. 100% villages have power supply. 47 villages (100%) have drinking water supply. 20 villages (42.55%) have post offices. 45 villages (95.74%) have telephones (including landlines, public call offices and mobile phones). 8 villages (17.02%) have pucca (paved) approach roads and 15 villages (31.91%) have transport communication (includes bus service, rail facility and navigable waterways). 1 village (2.13%) has an agricultural credit society and 5 villages (10.64%) have banks.

=== Agriculture ===
The South 24 Parganas had played a significant role in the Tebhaga movement launched by the Communist Party of India in 1946. Subsequently, Operation Barga was aimed at securing tenancy rights for the peasants. In the Jaynagar II CD block 2,264.89 acres of land was acquired and vested. Out of this 2,034.12 acres or 89.88% of the vested land was distributed. The total number of patta (document) holders was 1,342.

According to the District Human Development Report, agriculture is an important source of livelihood in the South Twentyfour Parganas district. The amount of cultivable land per agricultural worker is only 0.41 hectare in the district. Moreover, the irrigation facilities have not been extended to a satisfactory scale. Agriculture mostly remains a mono-cropped activity.

As per the District Census Handbook, the saline soil of the district is unfit for cultivation, but the non-salty lands are very fertile. While rice is the main food crop, jute is the main cash crop.

In 2013–14, there were 57 fertiliser depots, 9 seed stores and 54 fair price shops in the Jaynagar II CD block.

In 2013–14, the Jaynagar II CD block produced 27,359 tonnes of Aman paddy, the main winter crop, from 13,254 hectares, 461 tonnes of Boro paddy (spring crop) from 148 hectares. It also produced pulses and oilseeds.

=== Irrigation ===
In the Jaynagar II CD block, in 2013–14, 16.59 hectares were irrigated by deep tube well.

Poor irrigation and high soil salinity results in the mono-cropping pattern of cultivation in a major portion of the South 24 Parganas district. As a result of its closeness to the Bay of Bengal, the river waters are mostly saline and are unsuitable for irrigation. Added to the rather gloomy irrigation scenario is the problem of frequent floods.

=== Pisciculture ===
In the Jaynagar II CD block, in 2013–14, net area under effective pisciculture was 1,885 hectares, engaging 31,645 persons in the profession, and with an approximate annual production of 67,827 quintals.

Pisciculture is an important source of employment in the South 24 Parganas district. As of 2001, more than 4.5 lakh people were engaged in pisciculture. Out of this 2.57 lakhs were from the 13 blocks in the Sundarbans settlements.

=== Banking ===
In 2013–14, the Jaynagar II CD block had offices of 8 commercial banks and 2 gramin banks.

=== Backward Regions Grant Fund ===
The South 24 Parganas district is listed as a backward region and receives financial support from the Backward Regions Grant Fund. The fund, created by the Government of India, is designed to redress regional imbalances in development. As of 2012, 272 districts across the country were listed under this scheme. The list includes 11 districts of West Bengal.

== Transport ==
The Jaynagar II CD block has 1 ferry service and 2 originating/ terminating bus routes. The nearest railway station is 3 km from the block headquarters.

== Education ==
In 2013–14, the Jaynagar II CD block had 113 primary schools with 19,970 students, 5 middle schools with 920 students, 7 high schools with 2,603 students and 11 higher secondary schools with 14,447 students. Jaynagar II CD block had 445 institutions for special and non-formal education with 20,436 students.

See also – Education in India

According to the 2011 census, in the Jaynagar II CD block, among the 47 inhabited villages, 3 villages did not have a school, 27 villages had two or more primary schools, 19 villages had at least 1 primary and 1 middle school and 13 villages had at least 1 middle and 1 secondary school.

== Healthcare ==
In 2014, the Jaynagar II CD block had 1 rural hospital, 3 primary health centres and 1 NGO/ private nursing home with total 57 beds and 9 doctors (excluding private bodies). It had 47 family welfare subcentres. 5,075 patients were treated indoor and 176,634 patients were treated outdoor in the hospitals, health centres and subcentres of the CD block.

According to the 2011 census, in the Jaynagar II CD block, 3 villages had primary health centres, 16 villages had primary health subcentres, 1 village had a maternity and child welfare centre, 10 villages had medicine shops and out of the 47 inhabited villages 17 villages had no medical facilities.

Sri Ramakrishna Rural Hospital at Nimpith with 30 beds is the major government medical facility in the Jaynagar II CD block. There are primary health centres at Naya Pukuria (with 6 beds), Mayahauri (with 6 beds), Nalgora (PO Sonatikri) (with 10 beds).
