= Taranagar (disambiguation) =

Taranagar is a city and municipality in Rajasthan, India.

Taranagar may also refer to:

- Taranagar (Rajasthan Assembly constituency)
- Taranagar, Jaynagar, West Bengal, India

== See also ==
- Tara Nagar, village in Nepal
