= Ganesh Chandra Mondal =

Indian politician

Member of the West Bengal Legislative Assembly
- Incumbent
- Assumed office 2 May 2021
- Preceded by: Ram Sankar Halder
- Constituency: Kultali

Personal details
- Born: 8 July 1980 (age 46)
- Party: Trinamool Congress (until 2026); Democratic Trinamool Congress (from 2026)
- Profession: Politician

Ganesh Chandra Mondal is an Indian politician. He is a member of the Democratic Trinamool Congress. He is an MLA, elected from the Kultali constituency in the 2021 West Bengal Legislative Assembly election.
