= Joy Krishna Halder =

Indian politician

MLA
- In office 2006-2011
- Preceded by: Probodh Purkait
- Succeeded by: Ramsankar Halder
- Constituency: Kultali

Personal details
- Born: 1958 (age 67–68)
- Party: Socialist Unity Centre of India (Communist)

Joy Krishna Halder is an Indian politician, belonging to the Socialist Unity Centre of India (Communist). He was a member of the legislative assembly of West Bengal between 2006 and 2011, representing the Kutali seat. Halder lost the Kutali seat in the 2011 election to CPI(M) candidate Ramsankar Halder, the first time SUCI(C) lost the seat since 1977. SUCI(C) accused the Indian National Congress of cooperating with CPI(M) to defeat their candidate.
