= Biswanath Das =

Indian politician (born 1965)

Member of the West Bengal Legislative Assembly
- Incumbent
- Assumed office 2016
- Preceded by: Tarun Kanti Naskar
- Constituency: Jaynagar

Personal details
- Born: 3 October 1965 (age 60) Jaynagar Majilpur, South 24 Parganas, West Bengal, India
- Party: All India Trinamool Congress
- Parent: Satish Chandra Das (father)
- Education: University of Calcutta
- Occupation: Politician
- Profession: School Teacher

Biswanath Das (born 3 October 1965) is an Indian politician who has been a Member of Legislative Assembly for Jaynagar since 2016. He is a member of the All India Trinamool Congress party.

== Personal life ==
Biswanath Das was born on 3 October 1965, to a Bengali Hindu family in Jaynagar Majilpur. He is a postgraduate of the University of Calcutta. He was a school teacher before entering politics.

== Political career ==
In the 2016 Vidhan Sabha election, the All India Trinamool Congress nominated Biswanath Das from the Jaynagar Vidhan Sabha constituency. In this election, he defeated his nearest rival Sujit Patwari of the Indian National Congress by 15,051 votes.
