= Ram Sankar Halder =

Indian politician

Ram Sankar Halder (born 1955) is an Indian politician from West Bengal. He is a former two time member of the West Bengal Legislative Assembly from Kultali Assembly constituency, which is reserved for Scheduled Caste community, in South 24 Parganas district. He was elected in the 2016 West Bengal Legislative Assembly election representing the Communist Party of India (Marxist).

== Early life and education ==
Halder is from Kultali, South 24 Parganas district, West Bengal. He is the son of late Haridas Halder. He studied Class 12 and passed the examinations conducted by the West Bengal Board of Secondary Education in 1973.

== Career ==
Halder was first elected as an MLA from Kultali Assembly constituency winning the 2011 West Bengal Legislative Assembly election representing the Communist Party of India (Marxist). He polled 81,297 votes and defeated his nearest rival, Joy Krishna Halder of the Socialist Unity Centre of India (Communist) Party (SUCI (C)), by a margin of 4,813 votes. He retained the seat for the Communist Party winning the 2016 West Bengal Legislative Assembly election defeating Gopal Majhi of the All India Trinamool Congress by a margin of 11,724 votes. However, he lost the next election in the 2021 West Bengal Legislative Assembly election which was won by Ganesh Chandra Mondal of the Trinamool Congress. Sankar Halder finished third behind second placed Mintu Halder of the Bharatiya Janata Party.
