= Kultali (community development block) =

Community Development Block in West Bengal, India

- Community Development Block
- Location of Kultali community development block in South 24 Parganas district
- Coordinates: 22.0866°N 88.5937°E
- Country: India
- State: West Bengal
- Division: Presidency
- District: South 24 Parganas
- Subdivision: Baruipur
- Headquarters: Jamtala

Government
  - Gram Panchayats: Deulbari Debipur, Gopalganj, Gurguria Bhubaneswari, Jalaberia-I, Jalaberia-II, Kundakhali Godabar, Maipith Baikunthapur, Meriganj-I, Meriganj-II
  - Lok Sabha constituencies: Jaynagar
  - Vidhan Sabha constituencies: Kultali

Area
  - Total: 306.18 km^{2} (118.22 sq mi)

Population (2011)
  - Total: 229,053
  - Density: 748.10/km^{2} (1,937.6/sq mi)

Demographics
  - Literacy: 69.37 per cent
  - Sex ratio: 948 ♂/♀

Languages
  - Official: Bengali
  - Additional official: English
- Time zone: UTC+05:30 (IST)
- Website: s24pgs.gov.in

Kultali is a community development block that forms an administrative division in Baruipur subdivision of South 24 Parganas district in the Indian state of West Bengal.

== Geography ==

The Kultali CD block is located at 22°05′12″N 88°35′37″E. It has an average elevation of 7 metres (23 ft).

The Kultali CD block is bounded by the Jaynagar I and Canning I CD blocks in the north, the Basanti CD block in a part of the east, Sundarbans National Park in parts of the east and south, and the Jaynagar II CD block in the west.

The South 24 Parganas district is divided into two distinct physiographic zones: the marine-riverine delta in the north and the marine delta zone in the south. As the sea receded southwards, in the sub-recent geological period, a large low-lying plain got exposed. Both tidal inflows and the rivers have been depositing sediments in this plain. The periodical collapse of both the natural levees and man-made embankments speed up the process of filling up of the depressions containing brackish water wetlands. The marine delta in the south is formed of interlacing tidal channels. As non-saline water for irrigation is scarce, agriculture is monsoon dominated. Some parts of the wetlands are still preserved for raising fish.

The Kultali CD block has an area of 306.18 km^{2}. It has 1 panchayat samity, 9 gram panchayats, 120 gram sansads (village councils), 46 mouzas and 43 inhabited villages, as per the District Statistical Handbook, South Twenty-four Parganas. Kultali and Maipith Coastal police stations serve this CD Block. Headquarters of this CD block is at Jamtala.

The Kultali CD block has 191.561 km of embankments. Breaches in these embankments varied from 5 km in 2003-04 to 23.4 km in 2006-07. Embankments raised along rivers are of critical importance for the safety of lives and protection of crops, against daily tides and tidal surges. Technologically the embankment structures are weak and there is need of proper drainage of accumulated rain water through sluice gates. Crude cuts in embankments for drainage of accumulated rain water and channels built for providing water to large fisheries (bheris) also add to the hazards. Cyclones and tropical depressions are regular threats.

Gram panchayats of Kultali CD block/panchayat samiti are: Deulbari Debipur, Gopalganj, Gurguria Bhubaneswari, Jalaberia-I, Jalaberia-II, Kundakhali Godabar, Maipith Baikunthapur, Meriganj-I and Meriganj-II.

== Demographics ==
=== Population ===
According to the 2011 Census of India, the Kultali CD block had a total population of 229,053, all of which were rural. There were 117,562 (51%) males and 111,491 (49%) females. There were 35,727 persons in the age range of 0 to 6 years. The Scheduled Castes numbered 104,193 (45.49%) and the Scheduled Tribes numbered 5,672 (2.48%).

According to the 2001 Census of India, the Kultali CD block had a total population of 187,942, out of which 97,272 were males and 90,670 were females. The Kultali CD block registered a population growth of 20.13 per cent during the 1991-2001 decade. Decadal growth for the South 24 Parganas district was 20.89 per cent. Decadal growth in West Bengal was 17.84 per cent. The Scheduled Castes at 89,102 formed around one-half the population. The Scheduled Tribes numbered 6,648.

Large villages (with 4,000+ population) in the Kultali CD block (2011 census figures in brackets): Meriganj (22,225), Kailashnagar (5,083), Purba Tetulberia (4,309), Dongajora (10,271), Kirtankhola (5,312), Godabar (4,361), Jalaberia (20,138), Korakhali (4,188), Jamtala (4,495), Paschim Gabtala (4,387), Madhabpur (4,725), Madhusudanpur (6,899), Dakshin Garankati (6,189), Gopalganj (7,853), Kaikhali (6,030), Sankizahan (8,811), Katamari (5,238), Dakshin Durgapur (5,346), Deulbari Debipur (7,315), Purba Gurguria (5,662), Madhya Gurguria (4,669), Debipur Gurguria (10,812), Bhubaneswari (6,936), Maipit (5,615), Binodpur (5,330), Baikuntapur (7,802) and Kishorimohanpur (6,483).

Other villages in the Kultali CD block include (2011 census figures in brackets): Kundakhali (3,307).

=== Literacy ===
According to the 2011 census, the total number of literate persons in the Kultali CD block was 134,101 (69.37% of the population over 6 years) out of which males numbered 78,601 (79.01% of the male population over 6 years) and females numbered 55,500 (59.14% of the female population over 6 years). The gender disparity (the difference between female and male literacy rates) was 19.86%. Kultali CD block had the lowest female literacy and highest gender disparity amongst all CD blocks of South 24 Parganas district.

According to the 2011 Census of India, literacy in the South 24 Parganas district was 77.51 Literacy in West Bengal was 77.08% in 2011. Literacy in India in 2011 was 74.04%.

According to the 2001 Census of India, the Kultali CD block had a total literacy of 60.09 per cent for the 6+ age group. While male literacy was 74.45 per cent female literacy was 44.58 per cent. The South 24 Parganas district had a total literacy of 69.45 per cent, male literacy being 79.19 per cent and female literacy being 59.01 per cent.

See also – List of West Bengal districts ranked by literacy rate

Literacy in CD blocks of
South 24 Parganas district
Alipore Sadar subdivision
Bishnupur I – 78.33%
Bishnupur II – 81.37%
Budge Budge I – 80.57%
Budge Budge II – 79.13%
Thakurpukur Maheshtala – 83.54%
Baruipur subdivision
Baruipur – 76.46%
Bhangar I – 72.06%
Bhangar II – 74.49%
Jaynagar I – 73.17%
Jaynagar II – 69.71%
Kultali – 69.37%
Sonarpur – 79.70%
Canning subdivision
Basanti – 68.32%
Canning I – 70.76%
Canning II – 66.51%
Gosaba – 78.98%
Diamond Harbour subdivision
Diamond Harbour I – 75.72%
Diamond Harbour II – 76.91%
Falta – 77.17%
Kulpi – 75.49%
Magrahat I – 73.82%
Magrahat II – 77.41%
Mandirbazar – 75.89%
Mathurapur I – 73.93%
Mathurapur II – 77.77%
Kakdwip subdivision
Kakdwip – 77.93%
Namkhana – 85.72
Patharpratima – 82.11%
Sagar – 84.21%
Source: 2011 Census: CD Block Wise
Primary Census Abstract Data

=== Language ===
Languages of Kultali CD block (2011)
1. Bengali (99.3%)
2. Hindi (0.67%)
3. Urdu (0.02%)
4. Others (0.01%)

At the time of the 2011 census, 99.30% of the population spoke Bengali, 0.67% Hindi and 0.02% Urdu as their first language.

=== Religion ===
Religion in Kultali CD block (2011)
Hinduism	69.81%
Islam	29.86%
Other or not stated	0.33%

In the 2011 Census of India, Hindus numbered 159,897 and formed 69.81% of the population in the Kultali CD block. Muslims numbered 68,385 and formed 29.86% of the population. Others numbered 771 and formed 0.33% of the population. In 2001, Hindus and Muslims were 73.23% and 26.66% of the population respectively.

The proportion of Hindus in the South Twenty-four Parganas district has declined from 76.0% in 1961 to 63.2% in 2011. The proportion of Muslims in South Twenty-four Parganas district has increased from 23.4% to 35.6% during the same period. Christians formed 0.8% in 2011.

== Rural poverty ==
As per the Human Development Report for the South 24 Parganas district, published in 2009, in the Kultali CD block the percentage of households below poverty line was 46.36%. The poverty rates were very high in the Sundarbans settlements with all the thirteen CD blocks registering poverty ratios above 30% and eight CD blocks had more than 40% of the population in the BPL category. The Sundarban region remains the most backward region in terms of quality of life. As per rural household survey in 2005, the proportion of households in the South 24 Parganas with poverty rates below poverty line was 34.11%, way above the state and national poverty ratios.

== Economy ==
=== Livelihood ===
Livelihood
in Kultali CD block
1. Cultivators (20.6%)
2. Agricultural labourers (45.8%)
3. Household industries (9.91%)
4. Other Workers (23.6%)

In the Kultali CD block in 2011, among the class of total workers, cultivators numbered 18,079 and formed 20.62%, agricultural labourers numbered 40,177 and formed 45.83%, household industry workers numbered 8,689 and formed 9.91% and other workers numbered 20,725 and formed 23.64%. Total workers numbered 87,670 and formed 38.27% of the total population, and non-workers numbered 141,383 and formed 61.73% of the population.

The District Human Development Report points out that in the blocks of the region situated in the close proximity of the Kolkata metropolis, overwhelming majority are involved in the non-agricultural sector for their livelihood. On the other hand, in the Sundarbans settlements, overwhelming majority are dependent on agriculture. In the intermediate region, there is again predominance of the non-agricultural sector. Though the region is not very close to Kolkata, many places are well connected and some industrial/ economic development has taken place.

Note: In the census records a person is considered a cultivator, if the person is engaged in cultivation/ supervision of land owned by self/government/institution. When a person who works on another person's land for wages in cash or kind or share, is regarded as an agricultural labourer. Household industry is defined as an industry conducted by one or more members of the family within the household or village, and one that does not qualify for registration as a factory under the Factories Act. Other workers are persons engaged in some economic activity other than cultivators, agricultural labourers and household workers. It includes factory, mining, plantation, transport and office workers, those engaged in business and commerce, teachers, entertainment artistes and so on.

=== Infrastructure ===
There are 43 inhabited villages in the Kultali CD block, as per the District Census Handbook, South Twenty-four Parganas, 2011. 100% villages have power supply. 42 villages (97.67%) have drinking water supply. 21 villages (48.84%) have post offices. 34 villages (79.07%) have telephones (including landlines, public call offices and mobile phones). 19 villages (44.19%) have pucca (paved) approach roads and 20 villages (46.51%) have transport communication (includes bus service, rail facility and navigable waterways). 5 villages (11.63%) have agricultural credit societies and 8 villages (18.60%) have banks.

=== Agriculture ===
The South 24 Parganas had played a significant role in the Tebhaga movement launched by the Communist Party of India in 1946. Subsequently, Operation Barga was aimed at securing tenancy rights for the peasants. In the Kultali CD block 5,859.51 acres of land was acquired and vested. Out of this 5,621.97 acres or 95.95% of the vested land was distributed. The total number of patta (document) holders was 10,375.

According to the District Human Development Report, agriculture is an important source of livelihood in the South Twentyfour Parganas district. The amount of cultivable land per agricultural worker is only 0.41 hectare in the district. Moreover, the irrigation facilities have not been extended to a satisfactory scale. Agriculture mostly remains a mono-cropped activity.

According to the District Census Handbook, the saline soil of the district is unfit for cultivation, but the non-salty lands are very fertile. While rice is the main food crop, jute is the main cash crop.

In 2013-14, there were 91 fertiliser depots, 4 seed stores and 38 fair price shops in the Kultali CD block.

In 2013–14, Kultali CD block produced 4.366 tonnes of Aman paddy, the main winter crop, from 2,749 hectares, 2,014 tonnes of Boro paddy (spring crop) from 752 hectares and 3,176 tonnes of potatoes from 168 hectares. It also produced pulses and oilseeds.

=== Pisciculture ===
In the Kultali CD block, in 2013-14, net area under effective pisciculture was 3,568 hectares, engaging 31,905 persons in the profession, and with an approximate annual production of 83,399 quintals.

Pisciculture is an important source of employment in the South 24 Parganas district. As of 2001, more than 4.5 lakh people were engaged in pisciculture. Out of this 2.57 lakhs were from the 13 blocks in the Sundarbans settlements.

=== Banking ===
In 2013-14, the Kultali CD block had offices of 3 commercial banks and 2 gramin banks.

=== Backward Regions Grant Fund ===
The South 24 Parganas district is listed as a backward region and receives financial support from the Backward Regions Grant Fund. The fund, created by the Government of India, is designed to redress regional imbalances in development. As of 2012, 272 districts across the country were listed under this scheme. The list includes 11 districts of West Bengal.

== Transport ==
Kultali CD block has 13 ferry services and 2 originating/ terminating bus routes. The nearest railway station is 21 km from the block headquarters.

== Education ==
In 2013-14, the Kultali CD block had 98 primary schools with 16,828 students, 9 middle schools with 2,012 students, 6 high schools with 5,005 students and 9 higher secondary schools with 10,074 students. Kultali CD block had 1 general degree college with 949 students, 410 institutions for special and non-formal education with 19,871 students.

See also – Education in India

According to the 2011 census, in the Kultali CD block, among the 43 inhabited villages, 1 village did not have a school, 26 villages had two or more primary schools, 24 villages had at least 1 primary and 1 middle school and 16 villages had at least 1 middle and 1 secondary school.

Kultali Dr. B .R. Ambedkar College was established at Kultali in 2005.

== Healthcare ==
In 2014, the Kultali CD block had 1 rural hospital, 4 primary health centres and 2 NGO/ private nursing homes with total 62 beds and 10 doctors (excluding private bodies). It had 43 family welfare subcentres. 3,858 patients were treated indoor and 163,952 patients were treated outdoor in the hospitals, health centres and subcentres of the CD block.

As per 2011 census, in the Kultali CD block, 4 villages had primary health centres, 26 villages had primary health subcentres, 1 village had a maternity and child welfare centre, 12 villages had medicine shops and out of the 43 inhabited villages 7 villages had no medical facilities.

Jaynagar Rural Hospital at Jamtala, with 25 beds is the major government medical facility for the Kultali CD block. There are primary health centres at Kantamari (with 6 beds), Maipit (with 6 beds), Kaikali (Gopalganj) (with 10 beds) and Bhubaneswari (with 6 beds).
