= Bhangar II =

Community Development Block in West Bengal, India

- Community Development Block
- Location of Bhangar II community development block in South 24 Parganas district
- Coordinates: 22.5126°N 88.6097°E
- Country: India
- State: West Bengal
- Division: Presidency
- District: South 24 Parganas
- Subdivision: Baruipur
- Headquarters: Bhangar

Government
  - Gram Panchayats: Bamanghata, Beenta-I, Beenta-II, Bhagawanpur, Bhogali-I, Bhogali-II, Chaltaberia, Polerhat-I, Polerhat-II, Shanpukur
  - Lok Sabha constituencies: Jadavpur
  - Vidhan Sabha constituencies: Bhangar

Area
  - Total: 162.04 km^{2} (62.56 sq mi)

Population (2011)
  - Total: 246,708
  - Density: 1,522.5/km^{2} (3,943.3/sq mi)

Demographics
  - Literacy: 74.45 per cent
  - Sex ratio: 940 ♂/♀

Languages
  - Official: Bengali
  - Additional official: English
- Time zone: UTC+05:30 (IST)
- Website: s24pgs.gov.in

Bhangar II is a community development block that forms an administrative division in Baruipur subdivision of South 24 Parganas district in the Indian state of West Bengal.

== Geography ==

The Bhangar II CD block is located at 22°30′45″N 88°36′35″E. It has an average elevation of 9 metres (30 ft).

The Bhangar II CD block is bounded by the Haroa CD block in the North 24 Parganas district in the north, the Minakhan CD block in the North 24 Parganas district in the east, the Bhangar I CD block in the south and the Rajarhat CD block in the North 24 Parganas district in the west.

The South 24 Parganas district is divided into two distinct physiographic zones: the marine-riverine delta in the north and the marine delta zone in the south. As the sea receded southwards, in the sub-recent Geological Period, a large low-lying plain got exposed. Both Tidal inflows and the rivers have been depositing sediments in this plain. The periodical collapse of both the natural Levees and man-made embankments speed up the process of filling up of the depressions containing Brackish Water wetlands. The marine delta in the south is formed of interlacing tidal channels. As non-saline water for irrigation is scarce, agriculture is Monsoon dominated. Some parts of the wetlands are still preserved for raising fish.

The Bhangar II CD block has an area of 162.04 km^{2}. It has 1 panchayat samity, 10 gram panchayats, 159 gram sansads (village councils), 60 mouzas and 60 inhabited villages, as per the District Statistical Handbook South Twenty-four Parganas. Kasipur and Kolkata Leather Complex police stations serve this CD Block. Headquarters of this CD block is at Bhangar.

Gram Panchayats of Bhangar II CD block/Panchayat Samiti are: Bamanghata, Beenta-I, Beenta-II, Bhagawanpur, Bhogali-I, Bhogali-II, Chaltaberia, Polerhat-I, Polerhat-II and Shanpukur.

== Demographics ==
=== Population ===
According to the 2011 Census of India, the Bhangar II CD block had a total population of 246,708, all of which were rural. There were 127,195 (52%) males and 119,513 (48%) females. There were 34,837 persons in the age range of 0 to 6 years. The Scheduled Castes numbered 48,893 (19.82%) and the Scheduled Tribes numbered 1,892 (0.77%).

According to the 2001 Census of India, the Bhangar II CD block had a total population of 207,418, out of which 107,221 were males and 100,197 were females. The Bhangar II CD block registered a population growth of 24.60 per cent during the 1991-2001 decade. Decadal growth for the South 24 Parganas district was 20.89 per cent. Decadal growth in West Bengal was 17.84 per cent. The Scheduled castes at 48,005 formed around one-fourth the population. The Scheduled Tribes numbered 3,547.

Large villages (with 4,000+ population) in the Bhangar II CD block (2011 census figures in brackets): Hat Gachha (5,882), Hadia (7,921), Dharmatala Pachuria (5,789), Swastayan Gachhi (6,966), Uriaparaur (4,893), Tona (8,914), Shyamnagar (5,078), Jaynagar (4,921), Naoabad (4,975), Pitha Pukuria (11,078), Jirangachhi (5,193), Benota (7,850), Chariswar (4,097), Bamunia (15,582), Saduli (4,230), Majherhat (7,797), Uttar Kasipur (10,782), Chandihat (5,272), Nanglapalpur (4,755), Bhogali (7,516), Nimkuria (5,604), Chalta Beria (4,167), Panapukur (5,770) and Uttar Kathalia (8,628).

Other villages in the Bhangar II block include (2011 census figures in brackets): Sanpukuria (2,654).

=== Literacy ===
According to the 2011 census, the total number of literate persons in the Bhangar II CD block was 157,734 (74.45% of the population over 6 years) out of which males numbered 85,372 (78.01% of the male population over 6 years) and females numbered 72,362 (70.64% of the female population over 6 years). The gender disparity (the difference between female and male literacy rates) was 7.37%. Gender disparity in literacy in the Bhangar II CD block was the lowest amongst all CD blocks in South 24 Parganas district.

According to the 2011 Census of India, literacy in the South 24 Parganas district was 77.51 Literacy in West Bengal was 77.08% in 2011. Literacy in India in 2011 was 74.04%.

According to the 2001 Census of India, Bhangar II CD block had a total literacy of 65.65 per cent for the 6+ age group. While male literacy was 72.89 per cent female literacy was 57.78 per cent. South 24 Parganas district had a total literacy of 69.45 per cent, male literacy being 79.19 per cent and female literacy being 59.01 per cent.

See also – List of West Bengal districts ranked by literacy rate

Literacy in CD blocks of
South 24 Parganas district
Alipore Sadar subdivision
Bishnupur I – 78.33%
Bishnupur II – 81.37%
Budge Budge I – 80.57%
Budge Budge II – 79.13%
Thakurpukur Maheshtala – 83.54%
Baruipur subdivision
Baruipur – 76.46%
Bhangar I – 72.06%
Bhangar II – 74.49%
Jaynagar I – 73.17%
Jaynagar II – 69.71%
Kultali – 69.37%
Sonarpur – 79.70%
Canning subdivision
Basanti – 68.32%
Canning I – 70.76%
Canning II – 66.51%
Gosaba – 78.98%
Diamond Harbour subdivision
Diamond Harbour I – 75.72%
Diamond Harbour II – 76.91%
Falta – 77.17%
Kulpi – 75.49%
Magrahat I – 73.82%
Magrahat II – 77.41%
Mandirbazar – 75.89%
Mathurapur I – 73.93%
Mathurapur II – 77.77%
Kakdwip subdivision
Kakdwip – 77.93%
Namkhana – 85.72
Patharpratima – 82.11%
Sagar – 84.21%
Source: 2011 Census: CD Block Wise
Primary Census Abstract Data

=== Language ===
Languages of Bhangar II CD block (2011)
1. Bengali (99.7%)
2. Hindi (0.28%)
3. Urdu (0.02%)
4. Others (0.01%)

At the time of the 2011 census, 99.69% of the population spoke Bengali, 0.28% Hindi and 0.02% Urdu as their first language.

=== Religion ===
Religion in Bhangar II CD block (2011)
Islam	70.49%
Hinduism	29.26%
Other or not stated	0.25%

In the 2011 Census of India, Muslims numbered 173,914 and formed 70.49% of the population in Bhangar II CD block. Hindus numbered 72,192 and formed 29.26% of the population. Others numbered 602 and formed 0.25% of the population. In 2001, Muslims and Hindus were 68.29% and 31.65% of the population respectively.

The proportion of Hindus in the South Twenty-four Parganas district has declined from 76.0% in 1961 to 63.2% in 2011. The proportion of Muslims in the South Twenty-four Parganas district has increased from 23.4% to 35.6% during the same period. Christians formed 0.8% in 2011.

== Rural poverty ==
According to the Human Development Report for the South 24 Parganas district, published in 2009, in the Bhangar II CD block the percentage of households below poverty line was 17.20%, a comparatively low level of poverty. In the north-east and mid central portion of the district, all CD blocks, with the exception of the Kulpi CD block, had poverty rates below 30%. As per rural household survey in 2005, the proportion of households in the South 24 Parganas with poverty rates below poverty line was 34.11%, way above the state and national poverty ratios. The poverty rates were very high in the Sundarbans settlements with all the thirteen CD blocks registering poverty ratios above 30% and eight CD blocks had more than 40% of the population in the BPL category.

== Economy ==
=== Livelihood ===
Livelihood
in Bhangar II CD block
1. Cultivators (23.2%)
2. Agricultural labourers (27.0%)
3. Household industries (6.81%)
4. Other Workers (42.9%)

In Bhangar II CD block in 2011, among the class of total workers, cultivators numbered 19,646 and formed 23.24%, agricultural labourers numbered 22,858 and formed 27.03%, household industry workers numbered 5,754 and formed 6.81% and other workers numbered 36,295 and formed 42.93%. Total workers numbered 84,553 and formed 34.27% of the total population, and non-workers numbered 162,155 and formed 65.73% of the population.

The District Human Development Report points out that in the blocks of the region situated in the close proximity of the Kolkata metropolis, overwhelming majority are involved in the non-agricultural sector for their livelihood. On the other hand, in the Sundarban region, overwhelming majority are dependent on agriculture. In the intermediate region, there is again predominance of the non-agricultural sector. Though the region is not very close to Kolkata, many places are well connected and some industrial/ economic development has taken place.

Note: In the census records a person is considered a cultivator, if the person is engaged in cultivation/ supervision of land owned by self/government/institution. When a person who works on another person's land for wages in cash or kind or share, is regarded as an agricultural labourer. Household industry is defined as an industry conducted by one or more members of the family within the household or village, and one that does not qualify for registration as a factory under the Factories Act. Other workers are persons engaged in some economic activity other than cultivators, agricultural labourers and household workers. It includes factory, mining, plantation, transport and office workers, those engaged in business and commerce, teachers, entertainment artistes and so on.

=== Infrastructure ===
There are 60 inhabited villages in the Bhangar II CD block, as per the District Census Handbook, South Twenty-four Parganas, 2011. 100% villages have power supply. 60 villages (100%) have drinking water supply. 21 villages (35.00%) have post offices. 59 villages (98.33%) have telephones (including landlines, public call offices and mobile phones). 41 villages (68.33%) have pucca (paved) approach roads and 24 villages (40.00%) have transport communication (includes bus service, rail facility and navigable waterways). 1 village (1.67%) has an agricultural credit society and 6 villages (10.00%) have banks.

=== Agriculture ===
The South 24 Parganas had played a significant role in the Tebhaga movement launched by the Communist Party of India in 1946. Subsequently, “Operation Barga” was aimed at securing tenancy rights for the peasants. In the Bhangar II CD block 969.24 acres of land was acquired and vested. Out of this 882.74 acres or 91.28% of the vested land was distributed among the peasants. The total number of patta (document) holders was 3,240.

According to the District Human Development Report, agriculture is an important source of livelihood in the South Twentyfour Parganas district. The amount of cultivable land per agricultural worker is only 0.41 hectare in the district. Moreover, the irrigation facilities have not been extended to a satisfactory scale. Agriculture mostly remains a mono-cropped activity.

As per the District Census Handbook, the saline soil of the district is unfit for cultivation, but the non-salty lands are very fertile. While rice is the main food crop, jute is the main cash crop.

In 2013-14, there were 133 fertiliser depots, 27 seed stores and 63 fair price shops in the Bhangar II CD block.

In 2013–14, the Bhangar II CD block produced 44,918 tonnes of Aman paddy, the main winter crop, from 18,289 hectares, 5,281 tonnes of Aus paddy (summer crop) from 2,044 hectares, 15,771 tonnes of Boro paddy (spring crop) from 5,789hectares, 1,779 tonnes of wheat from 602 hectares, 17,026 tonnes of jute from 853 hectares and 40,619 tonnes of potatoes from 1,228 hectares. It also produced pulses and oilseeds.

=== Irrigation ===
In the Bhangar II CD block, in 2013-14, 1678.61 hectares were irrigated by river lift irrigation and 2.14 hectares by deep tube wells.

Poor irrigation and high soil salinity results in the mono-cropping pattern of cultivation in a major portion of the South 24 Parganas district. As a result of its closeness to the Bay of Bengal, the river waters are mostly saline and are unsuitable for irrigation. Added to the rather gloomy irrigation scenario is the problem of frequent floods.

=== Pisciculture ===
In the Bhangar II CD block, in 2013-14, the net area under effective pisciculture was 3,401 hectares, engaging 24,808 persons in the profession, and with an approximate annual production of 130,216 quintals.

Pisciculture is an important source of employment in the South 24 Parganas district. As of 2001, more than 4.5 lakh people were engaged in pisciculture. Out of this 2.57 lakhs were from the 13 blocks in the Sundarbans settlements.

=== Banking ===
In 2013-14, the Bhangar II CD block had offices of 7 commercial banks and 2 gramin banks.

=== Backward Regions Grant Fund ===
The South 24 Parganas district is listed as a backward region and receives financial support from the Backward Regions Grant Fund. The fund, created by the Government of India, is designed to redress regional imbalances in development. As of 2012, 272 districts across the country were listed under this scheme. The list includes 11 districts of West Bengal.

== Transport ==
The Bhangar II CD block has 1 originating/ terminating bus route. The nearest railway station is 27 km from the block headquarters.

== Education ==
In 2013-14, the Bhangar II CD block had 93 primary schools with 15,477 students, 13 middle schools with 2,482 students, 3 high schools with 2,141 students and 10 higher secondary schools with 13,444 students. Bhangar II CD block had 3i8 institutions for special and non-formal education with 15,965 students.

See also – Education in India

According to the 2011 census, in the Bhangar II CD block, among the 60 inhabited villages, 1 village did not have a school, 30 villages had two or more primary schools, 31 villages had at least 1 primary and 1 middle school and 12 villages had at least 1 middle and 1 secondary school.

== Healthcare ==
Certain areas of the South 24 Parganas district have been identified where ground water is affected by Arsenic Contamination. High levels of arsenic in ground water were found in twelve CD blocks of the district. Water samples collected from tubewells in the affected places contained arsenic above the normal level (10 micrograms per litre as specified by the World Health Organization). The affected CD blocks are Baruipur, Bhangar I, Bhangar II, Bishnupur I, Bishnupur II, Basanti, Budge Budge II, Canning I, Canning II, Sonarpur, Magrahat II and Jaynagar I.

In 2014, the Bhangar II CD block had 1 rural hospital, 2 primary health centres and 6 private nursing homes with total 75 beds and 12 doctors (excluding private bodies). It had 28 family welfare subcentres. 1,583 patients were treated indoor and 103,641 patients were treated outdoor in the hospitals, health centres and subcentres of the CD block.

As per 2011 census, in the Bhangar II CD block, 7 villages had community health centres, 6 villages had primary health centres, 31 villages had primary health subcentres, 13 villages had maternity and child welfare centres, 4 villages had veterinary hospitals, 25 villages had medicine shops and out of the 60 inhabited villages 11 villages had no medical facilities.

Jirangacha Rural Hospital at Jirongachhi, with 30 beds, is the major government medical facility in the Bhangar II CD block. There are primary health centres at Bhangar (with 10 beds) and Tona (with 6 beds).
