= Probodh Purkait =

Indian politician

MLA (1967–72) & (1977–2006) (9 Terms)
- Preceded by: New Seat
- Succeeded by: Joy Krishna Halder
- Constituency: Kultali

Personal details
- Died: 26 March 2023 (aged 87)
- Party: Socialist Unity Centre of India (Communist)

Probodh Purkait (1936 – 26 March 2023) was an Indian politician from West Bengal. He was elected as an member of the West Bengal Legislative Assembly for a record nine times. He represented the Socialist Unity Centre of India (Communist) (SUCI(C)) from the Kultali Assembly constituency for nearly four decades.

== Early life ==
Purkait is from Kultali, Baruipur subdivision, South 24 Parganas district. He was a teacher before he entered politics. He was involved in the farmers' movement and the movement to recover benami land. He left teaching to join Socialist Unity Centre of India party.

== Career ==
Purkait was elected as an MLA for the first time winning the 1967 West Bengal Legislative Assembly election from Kultali Assembly constituency representing the Socialist Unity Centre of India (Communist). He retained the seat for SUCI (C) in the next election in 1969 and won for a third time in the 1971 West Bengal Legislative Assembly election. He lost to Arabinda Naskar of the Indian National Congress in the 1972 West Bengal Legislative Assembly election by a margin of 5,751 votes.

== Controversy and conviction ==
Purkait was kidnapped on the eve of the 1971 West Bengal Legislative Assembly election.

In 1996, a court case was opened against Purkait and other SUCI cadres, for alleged killing of two Indian National Congress supporters during a clash in 1985. On 12 November 1997, the Alipore sessions court, which held the trial, convicted six persons and acquitted 32, including Purkait.

Subsequently an appeal was filed by the State Government in the High Court and in 2005 Purkait and six others were given life sentence. SUCI has denounced the process as a false case and called the court ruling a conspiracy of the ruling Communist Party of India (Marxist) (CPI(M)). Supreme Court of India on 27 February 2007 dismissed the appeal filed by Prabodh Purkait against the judgment passed by the Division Bench of the Calcutta High Court.

In June 2013, the SUCI party members requested the then chief minister Mamata Banerjee to provide medical attention to the nine-time leader who is ailing in Alipore jail. He was released from jail on health grounds in 2023.
