= Prosun Kumar Ghosh =

Indian politician

Prosun Kumar Ghosh (died 1972) was an Indian politician from West Bengal, belonging to the Indian National Congress. He was a local leader of the Congress Party in the South 24 Parganas. He was elected to the West Bengal Legislative Assembly in 1972, but died just a few weeks after being elected.

== Biography ==
Ghosh graduated from the Scottish Church College in Calcutta. He served as the chairman of the Joynagar Majilpur Municipality He was the Joint Secretary of the 24 Parganas District Congress Committee, and after bifurcation of the Congress Party District organisation, he became the chairman of the South 24 Parganas Congress District Committee. He was active in many social organisations.

The Congress Party fielded Ghosh as its candidate for the Joynagar seat in the 1971 West Bengal Legislative Assembly election, confronting the incumbent Socialist Unity Centre of India legislator Subodh Banerjee. Banerjee retained the seat, with Ghosh finishing in second place with 23,656 votes (40.76%%). Ghosh again stood as the Congress Party candidate for the Joynagar seat in the March 11, 1972 West Bengal Legislative Assembly election, this time defeating Banerjee having obtained 29,675 votes (51.60%).

Ghosh died on 19 April 1972, shortly after the election. A by-election was held for the Joynagar assembly seat on 6 June 1972, which was won by Congress Party candidate Nirad Kumar Saha.
