= Kultali =

- Village
- Location in West Bengal Location in India
- Coordinates: 22.0866°N 88.5937°E
- Country: India
- State: West Bengal
- District: South 24 Parganas
- CD block: Kultali
- Elevation: 7 m (23 ft)

Languages
  - Official: Bengali
  - Additional official: English
- Time zone: UTC+5:30 (IST)
- PIN: 743338
- Telephone code: +91 3218
- Vehicle registration: WB-19 to WB-22, WB-95 to WB-99
- Lok Sabha constituency: Jaynagar (SC)
- Vidhan Sabha constituency: Kultali (SC)
- Website: www.s24pgs.gov.in

Kultali is a village within the jurisdiction of the Kultali police station in the Kultali CD block in the Baruipur subdivision of the South 24 Parganas district in the Indian state of West Bengal.

== Geography ==
Cities and towns in the southern part of Baruipur subdivision (including Baruipur, Jaynagar I & II, Kultali CD blocks) in South 24 Parganas district
M: municipal city/ town, CT: census town, R: rural/ urban centre, N: neighbourhood, H: historical place/ religious centre
Places linked with coastal activity are marked in blue
Owing to space constraints in the small map, the actual locations in a larger map may vary slightly

=== Area overview ===
Baruipur subdivision is a rural subdivision with moderate levels of urbanization. 31.05% of the population lives in the urban areas and 68.95% lives in the rural areas. In the southern portion of the subdivision (shown in the map alongside) there are 20 census towns. The entire district is situated in the Ganges Delta and the southern part is covered by the Baruipur-Jaynagar Plain. Archaeological excavations at Dhosa and Tilpi, on the bank of the Piyali River indicate the existence of human habitation around 2,000 years ago.

Note: The map alongside presents some of the notable locations in the subdivision. All places marked in the map are linked in the larger full screen map.

=== Location ===
Kultali is located at 22°05′12″N 88°35′37″E. It has an average elevation of 7 metres (23 ft).

Kultali is one of the largest islands in the Sundarbans. The islands in the area are accessible only by boat. About 85% of the population is very poor. They eke out an existence collecting non-timber forest produce like tiger prawn seeds, fishing, vending vegetables and fish, and by working for a daily wage.

Kultali is not identified as a separate place in 2011 census. The map of CD block Kultali on page 749 in the District Census Handbook for South 24 Parganas shows the Kultali police station in Dakshin Garankati mouza.

== Civic administration ==
=== Police station ===
Kultali police station covers an area of 244.26 km^{2} (94.31 sq mi). It has jurisdiction over parts of the Kultali CD block.

== Economy ==
=== Honey collection ===
Around 20,000 kg of honey is collected every year from the forests of Sundarbans. Mostly people from the Canning, Basanti, Gosaba, Kultali, Mathurapur, Patharpratima, Namkhana, Sagar and Kakdwip are honey collectors. The number of honey collectors has dwindled from around 1,500 a few years back to around 700 in 2007. From 1985 through 2004, about 75 honey collectors were killed by tigers in the forests. Now all honey collectors are insured for Rs. 50,000. The forest department has also intensified vigilance during the honey collection period. The range officers and guards are on full alert. No deaths have been reported since 2004.

=== Social service ===
From 1982, the services and programs provided by Baikunthapur Tarun Sangha have grown to include two crèches for infants, a sustainable agriculture project, agro-equipment support service, community grain bank, savings and micro-credit ventures, disaster mitigation and emergency relief services, rural library and literacy programs. BTS serves nearly 2,800 households out of the estimated 25,000 households on Kultali.

== Transport ==
A short stretch of local roads link Kultali to the Jaynagar-Jamtala Road. Jaynagar Majilpur railway station is located nearby.

== Education ==
Kultali Dr. B .R. Ambedkar College, established in 2005, is affiliated to the University of Calcutta. It offers honours courses in English, Bengali, history, education, philosophy, geography, political science and sociology, and a general course in arts.

== Healthcare ==
Jaynagar Rural Hospital, with 25 beds, at Jamtala, is the major government medical facility in the Kultali CD block.
