= Subodh Banerjee =

Indian politician

PWD Minister of West Bengal (1969), Labour Minister of West Bengal (1967), MLA (1952–1972)
- Constituency: Jaynagar

Personal details
- Born: 1918 Jaynagar Majilpur, Bengal Presidency, British India
- Died: 16 September 1974 (aged 55–56) Calcutta, West Bengal, India
- Party: Socialist Unity Centre of India

Subodh Banerjee (1918 – 16 September 1974) was an Indian politician, belonging to the Socialist Unity Centre of India. He introduced the Gherao principle as a formal mode of protest in the trade union sector of India while being the Labour Minister in the 1967 United Front Government in West Bengal. He was the PWD minister in the 1969 United Front Government of West Bengal. His lasting contribution was the removal of all statutes of "guardians and rulers" of the British Indian empire from public places in Kolkata. However, he appreciated the artistic value of many of them and stored them in some other public places not in the public view. He was called the Gherao minister and was recognised both by his friends and detractors as a 'scrupulously honest minister and a firebrand labour leader with incendiary oratorical skill'.

He was a member of the Central Committee of the SUCI and the first MLA of the party.

He represented the Jaynagar assembly constituency of West Bengal.

A auditorium has been made for the memory of his and Sachin Banerjee in Jaynagar by naming 'Sachin Banerjee-Subodh Banerjee Bhaban.
