= Jiran Gachhi =

- Village
- Location in West Bengal Location in India
- Coordinates: 22.5468°N 88.5397°E
- Country: India
- State: West Bengal
- District: South 24 Parganas
- CD block: Bhangar II

Area
  - Total: 1.70 km^{2} (0.66 sq mi)
- Elevation: 9 m (30 ft)

Population (2011)
  - Total: 5,193
  - Density: 3,050/km^{2} (7,910/sq mi)

Languages
  - Official: Bengali
  - Additional official: English
- Time zone: UTC+5:30 (IST)
- PIN: 700135
- Telephone code: +91 33
- Vehicle registration: WB-19 to WB-22, WB-95 to WB-99
- Lok Sabha constituency: Jadavpur
- Vidhan Sabha constituency: Bhangar
- Website: www.s24pgs.gov.in

Jiran Gachhi is a village within the jurisdiction of the Bhangar police station in the Bhangar II CD block in the Baruipur subdivision of the South 24 Parganas district in the Indian state of West Bengal.

== Geography ==
Cities and towns in the northern part of Baruipur subdivision (including Sonarpur, Bhangar I & II CD blocks) in South 24 Parganas district
M: municipal city/ town, CT: census town, R: rural/ urban centre, N: neighbourhood
Owing to space constraints in the small map, the actual locations in a larger map may vary slightly

=== Area overview ===
Baruipur subdivision is a rural subdivision with moderate levels of urbanization. 31.05% of the population lives in the urban areas and 68.95% lives in the rural areas. In the northern portion of the subdivision (shown in the map alongside) there are 10 census towns. The entire district is situated in the Ganges Delta and the northern part of the subdivision is a flat plain bordering the metropolis of Kolkata.

Note: The map alongside presents some of the notable locations in the subdivision. All places marked in the map are linked in the larger full screen map.

=== Location ===
Jiran Gachhi is located at 22°32′48″N 88°32′23″E. It has an average elevation of 9 metres (30 ft).

== Demographics ==
According to the 2011 Census of India, Jiran Gachhi had a total population of 5,193, of which 2,724 (52%) were males and 2,769 (53%) were females. There were 773 persons in the age range of 0 to 6 years. The total number of literate persons in Jiran Gachhi was 3,136 (71.18% of the population over 6 years).

== Transport ==
A short stretch of local roads link Jiran Gachhi to the State Highway 3.

== Healthcare ==
Jiran Gachhi Rural Hospital, with 30 beds, is the major government medical facility in the Bhangar II CD block.
