= Kultali Assembly constituency =

West Bengal Legislative Assembly constituency

Kultali
- Constituency No. 129 for the West Bengal Legislative Assembly
- Interactive Map Outlining Kultali Assembly Constituency

Constituency details
- Country: India
- Region: East India
- State: West Bengal
- District: South 24 Parganas
- Lok Sabha constituency: Jaynagar
- Established: 1967
- Total electors: 265,540
- Reservation: SC

Member of Legislative Assembly
- 18th West Bengal Legislative Assembly
- Incumbent Ganesh Chandra Mondal
- Party: DTC
- Alliance: DTC+
- Elected year: 2026

Kultali Assembly constituency is a Legislative Assembly constituency of South 24 Parganas district in the Indian State of West Bengal. It is reserved for Scheduled Castes.

== Overview ==
As per order of the Delimitation Commission in respect of the Delimitation of constituencies in the West Bengal, Kultali Assembly constituency is composed of the following:

- Kultali community development block
- Baishata, Chuprijhara, Manirtat and Nalgora gram panchayats of Jaynagar II community development block

Kultali Assembly constituency is a part of No. 19 Jaynagar Lok Sabha constituency.

== Members of the Legislative Assembly ==
Year	Name	Party
1967	Probodh Purkait	Socialist Unity Centre of India (Communist)
1969	Probodh Purkait	Socialist Unity Centre of India (Communist)
1971	Probodh Purkait	Socialist Unity Centre of India (Communist)
1972	Arabinda Naskar	Indian National Congress
1977	Probodh Purkait	Socialist Unity Centre of India (Communist)
1982	Probodh Purkait	Socialist Unity Centre of India (Communist)
1987	Probodh Purkait	Socialist Unity Centre of India (Communist)
1991	Probodh Purkait	Socialist Unity Centre of India (Communist)
1996	Probodh Purkait	Socialist Unity Centre of India (Communist)
2001	Probodh Purkait	Socialist Unity Centre of India (Communist)
2006	Joy Krishna Halder	Socialist Unity Centre of India (Communist)
2011	Ram Sankar Halder	Communist Party of India (Marxist)
2016	Ram Sankar Halder	Communist Party of India (Marxist)
2021	Ganesh Chandra Mondal	Trinamool Congress
2026	Ganesh Chandra Mondal	Trinamool Congress

== Election results ==
=== 2026 ===
2026 West Bengal Legislative Assembly election: Kultali
Party	Candidate	Votes	%	±%
AITC	Ganesh Chandra Mondal	146,435	57.75	▲6.18
BJP	Madhabi Mahalder	87,159	34.38	▲3.56
CPI(M)	Ram Sankar Halder	13,361	5.27	▼3.53
SUCI(C)	Shankar Naskar	3,253	1.28	▼5.45
NOTA	None of the above	1,470	0.58	▲0.12
Majority		59,276	23.37	▲2.62
Turnout		253,551	96.86	▲11.25
AITC hold		Swing		

=== 2021 ===
2021 West Bengal Legislative Assembly election: Kultali
Party	Candidate	Votes	%	±%
AITC	Ganesh Chandra Mondal	117,238	51.57	▲20.13
BJP	Mintu Halder	70,061	30.82	▲25.58
CPI(M)	Ram Sankar Halder	20,010	8.8	▼28.57
SUCI(C)	Joy Krishna Halder	15,306	6.73	▼17.56
NOTA	None of the above	1,048	0.46	
Majority		47,177	20.75	
Turnout		227,351	85.61	
AITC gain from CPI(M)		Swing		

=== 2016 ===
2016 West Bengal Legislative Assembly election: Kultali
Party	Candidate	Votes	%	±%
CPI(M)	Ram Sankar Halder	73,932	37.37	▼11.23
AITC	Gopal Majhi	62,212	31.44	New entry
SUCI(C)	Joy Krishna Halder	48,058	24.29	▼21.44
BJP	Bikram Naskar	10,376	5.24	▲3.95
NOTA	None of the above	1,552	0.78	New entry
Majority		11,720	5.93	▲3.06
Turnout		1,97,859	85.96	▼3.03
CPI(M) hold		Swing		

=== 2011 ===
2011 West Bengal Legislative Assembly election: Kultali
Party	Candidate	Votes	%	±%
CPI(M)	Ram Sankar Halder	81,297	48.60	
SUCI(C)	Joy Krishna Halder	76,484	45.73	
INC	Sujit Patwari	3,277	1.96	
Independent	Sanjoy Mondal	2,177	1.30	
BJP	Nilkantha Mondal	2,159	1.29	
BSP	Khusilal Halder	948	0.57	
Independent	Shaktinath Halder	922	0.55	
Majority		4,813	2.87	
Turnout		1,67,264	88.99	
CPI(M) hold		Swing		

=== 2006 ===
In 2006, Joy Krishna Halder of SUCI(C) won the Kultali Assembly constituency defeating his nearest rival Ramsankar Halder of CPI(M). Probodh Purkait of SUCI(C) won from 1977 to 2001, defeating Ramsankar Halder of CPI(M) in 2001 and 1996, Ramani Ranjan Das of CPI(M) in 1991, Arabinda Naskar of INC in 1987 and 1982, and Anandi Tanti of Janata Party in 1977.

=== 1972 ===
Arabinda Naskar of INC won in 1972. Probodh Purkait of SUCI(C) won in 1971, 1969 and 1967. The seat did not exist prior to that.
