= Jaynagar Assembly constituency =

Vidhan Sabha Constituency in West Bengal, India

Coordinates: 22°10′31″N 88°25′12″E

Jaynagar
- Constituency No. 136 for the West Bengal Legislative Assembly
- Interactive Map Outlining Jaynagar Assembly Constituency

Constituency details
- Country: India
- Region: East India
- State: West Bengal
- District: South 24 Parganas
- Lok Sabha constituency: Jaynagar
- Established: 1951
- Total electors: 239,855
- Reservation: SC

Member of Legislative Assembly
- 18th West Bengal Legislative Assembly
- Incumbent Biswanath Das
- Party: TMC
- Alliance: INDIA+
- Elected year: 2026

Jaynagar Assembly constituency is a Legislative Assembly constituency of the South 24 Parganas district in the Indian State of West Bengal. It is reserved for Scheduled Castes.

== Overview ==
As per order of the Delimitation Commission in respect of the Delimitation of constituencies in the West Bengal, Jaynagar Assembly constituency is composed of the following:

- Jaynagar Majilpur municipality
- Baharu Kshetra, Dakshin Barasat, Harinarayanpur, Rajapur Korabeg, Sripur and Uttar Durgapur gram panchayats of the Jaynagar I community development block
- Beledurganagar, Futigoda, Gardoani, Mayahauri, Mayda and Sahajadapur gram panchayats of the Jaynagar II community development block

Jaynagar Assembly constituency is a part of the No. 19 Jaynagar Lok Sabha constituency.

== Members of the Legislative Assembly ==
Year	Name	Party
1952	Subodh Banarjee	Socialist Unity Centre of India (Communist)
1952	Dinataran Moni	Socialist Unity Centre of India (Communist)
1957	Subodh Banarjee	Socialist Unity Centre of India (Communist)
1957	Renupada Halder	Socialist Unity Centre of India (Communist)
1962	Jnantosh Chakraborty (Jaynagar Uttar)	Indian National Congress
1962	Anadi Mohan Tanti (Jaynagar Dakshin)	Indian National Congress
1967	Subodh Banarjee	Socialist Unity Centre of India (Communist)
1969	Subodh Banarjee	Socialist Unity Centre of India (Communist)
1971	Subodh Banarjee	Socialist Unity Centre of India (Communist)
1972	Prasun Ghosh	Indian National Congress
1977	Debaprasad Sarkar	Socialist Unity Centre of India (Communist)
1982	Debaprasad Sarkar	Socialist Unity Centre of India (Communist)
1987	Debaprasad Sarkar	Socialist Unity Centre of India (Communist)
1991	Debaprasad Sarkar	Socialist Unity Centre of India (Communist)
1996	Debaprasad Sarkar	Socialist Unity Centre of India (Communist)
2001	Debaprasad Sarkar	Socialist Unity Centre of India (Communist)
2006	Debaprasad Sarkar	Socialist Unity Centre of India (Communist)
2011	Tarun Kanti Naskar	Socialist Unity Centre of India (Communist)
2016	Biswanath Das	Trinamool Congress
2021	Biswanath Das	Trinamool Congress
2026	Biswanath Das	Trinamool Congress

== Election results ==
Vote share of Winning candidates
2026	49.38%
2021	51.85%
2016	36.23%
2011	49.38%
2006	45.64%
2001	40.14%
1996	43.41%
1991	40.39%
1987	44.77%
1982	40.97%
1977	48.60%
1972	51.60%
1971	41.19%
1969	54.88%
1967	61.60%
1962	52.59%
1962	59.73%
1957	20.40%
1957	14.83%
1952	15.64%
1952	13.47%

=== 2026 ===
2026 West Bengal Legislative Assembly election: Jaynagar
Party	Candidate	Votes	%	±%
TMC	Biswanath Das	108,194	49.38	▼2.47
BJP	Alok Halder	81,844	37.35	▲4.61
CPI(M)	Apurba Pramanik	18,151	8.28	▼0.3
SUCI(C)	Niranjan Naskar	2,818	1.29	▼3.36
Independent	Bidhan Chandra Malik	2,411	1.1	
NOTA	None of the above	903	0.41	▼0.17
Majority		26,350	12.03	▼7.08
Turnout		219,107	96.38	▲12.02
TMC hold		Swing		

=== 2021 ===
2021 West Bengal Legislative Assembly election: Jaynagar
Party	Candidate	Votes	%	±%
TMC	Biswanath Das	104,952	51.85	▲15.62
BJP	Rabin Sardar	66,269	32.74	▲22.21
CPI(M)	Apurba Pramanik	17,368	8.58	
SUCI(C)	Tarun Kanti Naskar	9,423	4.65	▼17.45
NOTA	None of the above	1,164	0.58	
Majority		38,683	19.11	
Turnout		202,431	84.36	
TMC hold		Swing		

=== 2016 ===
2016 West Bengal Legislative Assembly election: Jaynagar
Party	Candidate	Votes	%	±%
TMC	Biswanath Das	64,582	36.23	New entry
INC	Sujit Patwari	49,531	27.78	▲18.24
SUCI(C)	Tarun Kanti Naskar	39,397	22.10	▼27.28
BJP	Utpal Kumar Mondal	18,055	10.53	▲3.84
NOTA	None of the above	1,548	0.87	New entry
Independent	Tarun Naskar	1,417	0.79	New entry
Independent	Dilip Sardar	1,257	0.71	New entry
BSP	Amulya Kumar Sardar	841	0.47	New entry
Independent	Sankar Deb Mondal	718	0.40	New entry
BMP	Manabendra Nath Halder	492	0.28	New entry
Independent	Taranga Mondal	431	0.24	New entry
Majority		15,051	8.45	▼9.90
Turnout		1,78,269	84.38	▲1.47
TMC gain from SUCI(C)		Swing		

=== 2011 ===
2011 West Bengal Legislative Assembly election: Jaynagar
Party	Candidate	Votes	%	±%
SUCI(C)	Tarun Kanti Naskar	71,566	49.38	
CPI(M)	Shyamali Halder	44,976	31.03	
INC	Manoranjan Halder	13,829	9.54	
BJP	Utpal Kumar Mondal	9,694	6.69	
PDCI	Sanjay Kumar Roy	2,985	2.06	
Independent	Sanatan Halder	1,890	1.30	
Majority		26,590	18.35	
Turnout		1,44,940	82.91	
SUCI(C) hold		Swing		

=== 2006 ===
2006 West Bengal Legislative Assembly election: Joynagar
Party	Candidate	Votes	%	±%
Independent	Debaprasad Sarkar	59,749	45.64	
CPI(M)	Asish Ghosh	46,263	35.34	
TMC	Nirmal Kanti Mondal	21,707	16.58	
PDS	Meherul Islam Sekh	1,711	1.31	
BSP	Niranjan Naskar	1,491	1.14	
Majority		13,486	10.30	
Turnout		130,921		
Independent hold		Swing		

=== 2001 ===
2001 West Bengal Legislative Assembly election: Joynagar
Party	Candidate	Votes	%	±%
Independent	Debaprasad Sarkar	49,534	40.14	
CPI(M)	Abul Hossain Laskar	33,853	27.43	
TMC	Gour Sarkar	23,662	19.17	
BJP	Sankar Sarkar	12,487	10.12	
IND	Sushil Kumar Sarkar	1,330	1.08	
PDS	Dhananjoy Sinha	1,135	0.92	
IND	Pradyut Ghosh	753	0.61	
BSP	Pintu Kumar Sanpui	647	0.52	
Majority		15,681	12.71	
Turnout		123,436	74.24	
Independent hold		Swing		

=== 1996 ===
1996 West Bengal Legislative Assembly election: Joynagar
Party	Candidate	Votes	%	±%
Independent	Deba Prasad Sarkar	52,718	43.41	
CPI(M)	Rabindra Nath Basu	27,224	22.42	
INC	Mritunjay Modak	25,967	21.38	
BJP	Debotosh Acharya	12,729	10.48	
IUML	Khalilur Rahaman Molla	1,984	1.63	
IND	Gour Haldar	626	0.52	
IND	Gazi Jalal Uddin	197	0.16	
Majority		25,494	20.99	
Turnout		125,298	81.53	
Independent hold		Swing		

=== 1991 ===
1991 West Bengal Legislative Assembly election: Joynagar
Party	Candidate	Votes	%	±%
Independent	Deba Prasad Sarkar	43,375	40.39	
INC	Prasanta Sarkhel	31,191	29.04	
CPI(M)	Rajaul Karim Laskar	19,226	17.90	
BJP	Bhubaneshwar Bhattacharya	12,410	11.56	
IUML	Gazi Liakat	805	0.75	
IND	Golam Nabi Molla	243	0.23	
IND	Md. Gazi Jalal	143	0.13	
Majority		12,184	11.35	
Turnout		110,494	79.46	
Swing to Independent from SUCI(C)		Swing		

=== 1987 ===
1987 West Bengal Legislative Assembly election: Joynagar
Party	Candidate	Votes	%	±%
SUCI(C)	Deba Prasad Sarkar	43,087	44.77	
INC	Kumud Bhattacharya	34,526	35.87	
CPI(M)	Samir Putatundu	17,518	18.20	
IND	Hedayat Molla	383	0.40	
IND	Mahadeb Paul	314	0.33	
IND	Dibakar Nasker	246	0.26	
IND	Md. Rafiqul Hasan	173	0.18	
Majority		8,561	8.90	
Turnout		97,940	82.64	
SUCI(C) hold		Swing		

=== 1982 ===
1982 West Bengal Legislative Assembly election: Joynagar
Party	Candidate	Votes	%	±%
SUCI(C)	Deva Prasad Sarkar	33,147	40.97	
IC(S)	Kumud Bhattacherjee	32,737	40.46	
CPI(M)	Amarendra Nath Dey	15,024	18.57	
Majority		410	0.51	
Turnout		82,432	82.96	
SUCI(C) hold		Swing		

=== 1977 ===
1977 West Bengal Legislative Assembly election: Joynagar
Party	Candidate	Votes	%	±%
SUCI(C)	Deba Prosad Sarkar	27,778	48.60	
JP	Jnantosh Chakraborti	13,258	23.20	
INC	Nirede Kumar Saha	11,063	19.36	
CPI(M)	Amarendra Nath Dey	4,577	8.01	
RPI	Hamid Ali Mollick	482	0.84	
Majority		14,520	25.40	
Turnout		58,054	61.10	
Swing to SUCI(C) from INC		Swing		

=== 1972 ===
1972 West Bengal Legislative Assembly election: Joynagar
Party	Candidate	Votes	%	±%
INC	Prosun Ghosh	29,675	51.60	
SUCI(C)	Subodh Banerjee	27,840	48.40	
Majority		1,835	3.20	
Turnout		58,646	69.20	
Swing to INC from SUCI(C)		Swing		

=== 1971 ===
1971 West Bengal Legislative Assembly election: Joynagar
Party	Candidate	Votes	%	±%
SUCI(C)	Subodh Banerjee	23,904	41.19	
INC	Prosun Ghosh	23,656	40.76	
IND	Hajimoksedur Rahman Molia	6,903	11.89	
CPI(M)	Arun Kumar Ghosh	3,572	6.15	
Majority		248	0.43	
Turnout		60,209	74.14	
SUCI(C) hold		Swing		

=== 1969 ===
1969 West Bengal Legislative Assembly election: Joynagar
Party	Candidate	Votes	%	±%
SUCI(C)	Subodh Banerjee	31,873	54.88	
INC	Rabindra Nath Bhose	25,546	43.99	
PML	Molla Kaassem Ali	567	0.98	
NDF	L. Knater Ali	89	0.15	
Majority		6,327	10.89	
Turnout		58,922	74.30	
Swing to SUCI(C) from Independent		Swing		

=== 1967 ===
1967 West Bengal Legislative Assembly election: Joynagar
Party	Candidate	Votes	%	±%
Independent	S. Banerjee	34,772	61.60	
INC	J. Chakravartty	14,355	25.43	
IND	S. N. Haldar	5,930	10.51	
IND	K. M. Abdullam	766	1.36	
IND	N. Chatterjee	626	1.11	
Majority		20,417	36.17	
Turnout		58,842	75.19	

=== 1962 ===
==== 1962 (Joynagar North) ====
1962 West Bengal Legislative Assembly election: Joynagar North
Party	Candidate	Votes	%	±%
INC	Jnantosh Chakravarti	24,185	52.59	
SUCI(C)	Subodh Banerje	19,990	43.46	
IND	Sambhu Charan Ghosh	1,817	3.95	
Majority		4,195	9.13	
Turnout		47,763	65.26	

==== 1962 (Joynagar South) (SC) ====
1962 West Bengal Legislative Assembly election: Joynagar South (SC)
Party	Candidate	Votes	%	±%
INC	Anadi Mohan Tanti	27,902	59.73	
SUCI(C)	Renupada Halder	15,897	34.03	
IND	Bhutnath Moni	2,914	6.24	
Majority		12,005	25.70	
Turnout		48,737	58.32	

=== 1957 ===
1957 West Bengal Legislative Assembly election: Joynagar (SC) (2 seats)
Party	Candidate	Votes	%	±%
Independent	Subodh Banerjee	22,933	20.40	
Independent	Renupada Halder	16,668	14.83	
INC	Suhrit Gopal Datta	15,669	13.94	
IND	Sailendra Nath Haider	14,819	13.18	
IND	Kaze Mohammad Abdulla	14,402	12.81	
INC	Dintaran Moni	13,149	11.70	
IND	Sreedhar Chandra Mondal	4,666	4.15	
IND	Jnantosh Chakravarty	4,105	3.65	
IND	Anil Mistry	3,333	2.97	
IND	Dibakar Halder	2,659	2.37	
Majority		6,265	5.57	
Turnout		112,403	89.63	

=== 1952 ===
1952 West Bengal Legislative Assembly election: Joynagar (2 seats)
Party	Candidate	Votes	%	±%
Independent	Subodh Banerjee	14,244	15.64	
Independent	Dintaran Moni	12,265	13.47	
ABJS	Dhirendra Nath Mondal	11,689	12.84	
INC	Hari Sankar Chatterji	10,368	11.39	
IND	Mukbul Naskar	10,254	11.26	
INC	Dhruba Chand Halder	8,783	9.64	
ABJS	Anil Mistri	5,783	6.35	
IND	Bipin Chandra Saha	4,634	5.09	
IND	Bejoy Kumar Chattopadhaya	4,301	4.72	
IND	Wazedali Akhond	3,024	3.32	
IND	Uddhabchandra Mondal	2,352	2.58	
IND	Moniruddin Ahmad	2,178	2.39	
RRP	Ganga Prosad Sarkar	1,190	1.31	
Majority		576	0.63	
Turnout		91,065	80.56	
