= Baruipur subdivision =

Subdivision in West Bengal, India

Baruipur
- Subdivision
- Location of Baruipur subdivision in South 24 Parganas district
- Coordinates: 22.3654432°N 88.4325028°E
- Country: India
- State: West Bengal
- Division: Presidency
- District: South 24 Parganas
- Headquarters: Baruipur

Government
  - CD Blocks: Bhangar I, Bhangar II, Sonarpur, Baruipur, Jaynagar I, Jaynagar II, Kultali
  - Lok Sabha constituencies: Jaynagar, Jadavpur
  - Vidhan Sabha constituencies: Kultali, Jaynagar, Baruipur Purba, Baruipur Paschim, Sonarpur Dakshin, Bhangar, Sonarpur Uttar

Area
  - Total: 1,350.50 km^{2} (521.43 sq mi)

Population (2011)
  - Total: 2,396,646
  - Density: 1,774.64/km^{2} (4,596.29/sq mi)
  - Urban: 744,224

Demographics
  - Literacy: 77.45 per cent
  - Sex ratio: 956 ♂/♀

Languages
  - Official: Bengali
  - Additional official: English
- Time zone: UTC+05:30 (IST)
- Website: s24pgs.gov.in

Baruipur Sadar subdivision is an administrative subdivision of South 24 Parganas district in the Indian state of West Bengal.

== Overview ==
Baruipur subdivision is a rural subdivision with moderate levels of urbanization. 31.05% of the population lives in the urban areas and 68.95% lives in the rural areas. The entire district is situated in the Ganges Delta. The northern part of the subdivision is a flat plain bordering the metropolis of Kolkata and the southern part is covered by the Baruipur-Jaynagar Plain. Archaeological excavations at Dhosa and Tilpi, on the bank of the Piyali River indicate the existence of human habitation around 2,000 years ago.

== Subdivisions ==

South 24 Parganas district is divided into five administrative subdivisions:

Subdivision	Headquarters	Area (km^{2})	Population (2011)	Urban population %	Rural Population %
Alipore	Alipore	427.43	1,490,342	59.85	40.15
Baruipur Sadar	Baruipur	1,355.44	2,396,643	31.05	68.95
Canning	Canning	1,103.73	1,140,562	12.37	87.63
Diamond Harbour	Diamond Harbour	1,264.68	2,125,758	14.61	85.39
Kakdwip	Kakdwip	1,389.93	1,008,653	0	100
South 24 Parganas	Alipore	9,960,00	8,161,961	25.58	74.42

29.36% of the total population of South 24 Parganas district live in Baruipur subdivision.

== Administrative units ==
Baruipur subdivision has 9 police stations, 7 community development blocks, 7 panchayat samitis, 80 gram panchayats, 523 mouzas, 482 inhabited villages, 3 municipalities and 30 census towns. The municipalities are at Rajpur Sonarpur, Baruipur and Jaynagar Majilpur. The census towns are: Radhanagar, Danga, Ramchandrapur, Bidyadharpur, Kalikapur, Chak Baria, Sahebpur, Raynagar, Kalikapur Barasat, Baharu, Uttarparanij, Alipur, Uttar Durgapur, Nimpith, Tulshighata, Petua, Garia, Panchghara, Mallikpur, Hariharpur, Champahati, Solgohalia, Naridana, Baruipur (CT), Salipur (P), Khodar Bazar, Komarhat, Maricha, Bhangar Raghunathpur and Gobindapur.

=== Kolkata Urban Agglomeration ===
The following Municipalities and census towns in South 24 Parganas district were part of Kolkata Urban Agglomeration in the 2011 census: Maheshtala (M), Joka (CT), Balarampur (CT), Chata Kalikapur (CT), Budge Budge (M), Nischintapur (CT), Uttar Raypur (CT), Pujali (M) and Rajpur Sonarpur (M).

== Police stations ==
Police stations in Baruipur subdivision have the following features and jurisdiction:

Police Station	Area covered (km^{2})	Border (km)	Municipal town/ city	CD Block
Bhangar	121.87	-	-	Bhangar I
Kolkata Leather Complex	97.49	-	-	Bhangar I, Bhangar II
Kasipur	96.30	-	-	Bhangar II
Sonarpur	169.89	-	Rajpur Sonarpur	Sonarpur
Narendrapur	n/a	-	Rajpur Sonarpur	Sonarpur
Baruipur	235.66	-	Baruipur	Baruipur
Baruipur Women	n/a	-	Baruipur	Baruipur
Jaynagar	253.25	-	Jaynagar Majilpur	Jaynagar I, Jaynagar II
Kultali	244.16	-	-	Kultali, Jaynagar II
Maipit Coastal	131.88	-	-	Kultali

== CD Blocks ==

Community development blocks in Baruipur subdivision are:

CD Block	Headquarters	Area (km^{2})	Population (2011)	SC %	ST %	Hindus %	Muslims %	Literacy rate %	Census Towns
Bhangar I	Gobindapur	153.62	249,170	20.99	1.26	32.38	67.38	72.06	3
Bhangar II	Bhangar	162.04	246,708	19.82	0.77	29.26	70.49	74.45	-
Sonarpur	Rajpur	120.63	175,713	53.19	1.40	81.49	15.92	79.66	7
Baruipur	Piyali Town	226.16	433,119	38.22	0.26	61.86	30.96	76.46	12
Jaynagar I	Baharu	131.01	263,151	39.01	0.03	52.65	46.86	73.17	6
Jaynagar II	Nimpith	186.25	252,164	33.94	0.41	47.03	52.23	69.71	2
Kultali	Jamtala	306.18	229,053	45.49	2.48	69.81	29.86	69.37	-

== Gram panchayats ==
The subdivision contains 80 gram panchayats under 7 community development blocks:

- Bhangar I CD block consists of nine gram panchayats: Bodra, Chandaneswar-I, Chandaneswar-II, Durgapur, Jagulgachhi, Narayanpur, Pranganj, Shanksahar and Tarda.
- Bhangar II CD block consists of ten gram panchayats: Bamanghata, Beenta-I, Beenta-II, Bhagawanpur, Bhogali-I, Bhogali-II, Chaltaberia, Polerhat-I, Polerhat-II and Shanpukur.
- Sonarpur CD block consists of 11 gram panchayats: Banhooghly-I, Banhooghly-II, Kalikapur-I, Kalikapur-II, Kamrabad, Kheyadaha-I, Kheyadaha-II, Langalberia, Poleghat, Pratapnagar and Sonarpur-II.
- Baruipur CD block consists of 19 gram panchayats: Begumpur, Belegachhia, Brindakhali, Champahati, Dhapdhapi-I, Dhapdhapi-II, Hardhah, Hariharpur, Kalyanpur, Madarat, Mallikpur, Nabagram, Ramnagar-I, Ramnagar-II, Shankarpur-I, Shankarpur-II, Shikharbali-I, Shikharbali-II and South Garia.
- Jaynagar I CD block consists of 12 gram panchayats: Baharu Kshetra, Bamangachhi, Chaltaberia, Dakshin Barasat, Dhosa Chandaneswar, Harinarayanpur, Jangalia, Khakurdaha, Narayanitala, Rajapur Korabeg, Sripur and Uttar Durgapur.
- Jaynagar II CD block consists of ten gram panchayats: Baishata, Beledurganagar, Chuprijhara, Futigoda, Gardoani, Manirtat, Mayahauri, Mayda, Nalgora and Sahajadapur.
- Kultali CD block consists of nine gram panchayats: Deulbari Debipur, Gopalganj, Gurguria Bhubaneswari, Jalaberia-I, Jalaberia-II, Kundakhali Godabar, Maipith Baikunthapur, Meriganj-I and Meriganj-II.

== Municipal towns/ cities ==
An overview of the municipal towns and cities in Baruipur subdivision is given below:

Municipal town/ city	Area (km^{2})	Population (2011)	SC %	ST %	Hindus %	Muslims %	Literacy rate %
Rajpur Sonarpur	49.26	424,368	18.53	0.55	89.34	9.25	90.14
Baruipur	9.50	53,128	24.76	0.60	89.25	8.81	92.04
Jaynagar Majilpur	5.85	25,922	18.63	0.09	81.34	18.23	88.38

== Education ==
South 24 Parganas district had a literacy rate of 77.51% as per the provisional figures of the census of India 2011. Alipore Sadar subdivision had a literacy rate of 81.14%, Baruipur subdivision 77.45%, Canning subdivision 70.98%, Diamond Harbour subdivision 76.26% and Kakdwip subdivision 82.04%

Statistics in the table below give a comprehensive picture of the education scenario in South 24 Parganas district, with data for the year 2013-14:

Subdivision	Primary School		Middle School		High School		Higher Secondary School		General College, Univ		Technical / Professional Instt		Non-formal Education	
Subdivision	Institution	Student	Institution	Student	Institution	Student	Institution	Student	Institution	Student	Institution	Student	Institution	Student
Alipore Sadar	531	53,719	34	4,455	50	16,471	91	66,813	5	8,122	6	3,094	1,379	53,429
Baruipur	883	132,649	65	8,954	50	26,443	128	129,195	8	27,657	7	6,735	3,116	138,507
Canning	532	81,697	59	9,181	29	10,515	55	57,921	4	5,490	1	n/a	2,105	96,622
Diamond Harbour	1,212	116,407	61	6,680	98	38,470	145	113,147	7	20,061	5	1,774	3,140	137,378
Kakdwip	598	53,058	45	5,654	48	20,383	82	56,192	3	5,420	1	100	1,844	78,897
South 24 Parganas district*	3,756	437,530	264	34,924	275	118,282	501	423,268	27	66,750	20	11,703	11,584	504,833

.* Does not include data for portions of South 24 Parganas district functioning under Kolkata Municipal Corporation

The following institutions are located in Baruipur subdivision:

- Ramakrishna Mission Residential College was established at Narendrapur in 1960.
- Ramakrishna Mission Blind Boys Academy College was established at Narendrapur in 1965, It is affiliated with the University of Calcutta and is recognised by the Rehabilitation Council of India. It specialises in education/ teacher education. It has a hostel, a computer centre and a playground.
- Baruipur College was established at Baruipur in 1981.
- Al Ameen Memorial Minority College was established at Baruipur in 2008.
- Dhruba Chand Halder College was established at Dakshin Barasat in 1965.
- Kultali Dr. B .R. Ambedkar College was established at Kultali in 2005.
- Bhangar Mahavidyalaya was established at Bhangar in 1997.
- Sushil Kar College was established at Champahati in 1968.
- Sonarpur Mahavidyalaya was established at Sonarpur in 1985.
- Future Institute of Engineering and Management was established at Sonarpur in 2001.
- Rabindra Shiksha Sammilani Law College was established at Panchghara Petua, PO Subhashgram in 2003.
- Ashar Alo is a private school at Piyali in this block. It is a very special one where girl students from poor families are provided free education, which in addition to the standard formal education they are taught singing, dancing and drawing.

== Healthcare ==
The table below (all data in numbers) presents an overview of the medical facilities available and patients treated in the hospitals, health centres and sub-centres in 2014 in South 24 Parganas district.

Subdivision	Health & Family Welfare Deptt, WB				Other State Govt Deptts	Local bodies	Central Govt Deptts / PSUs	NGO / Private Nursing Homes	Total	Total Number of Beds	Total Number of Doctors	Indoor Patients	Outdoor Patients
Subdivision	Hospitals	Rural Hospitals	Block Primary Health Centres	Primary Health Centres	Other State Govt Deptts	Local bodies	Central Govt Deptts / PSUs	NGO / Private Nursing Homes	Total	Total Number of Beds	Total Number of Doctors	Indoor Patients	Outdoor Patients
Alipore Sadar	-	3	3	7	1	3	-	48	65	1,159	199	33,498	633,233
Baruipur	1	6	1	18	-	2	-	66	94	1,045	201	48,114	1,266,244
Canning	1	3	1	6	-	-	-	15	26	351	49	22,467	666,377
Diamond Harbour	1	6	3	17	-	-	-	68	95	1077	169	65,051	1,325,535
Kakdwip	1	3	1	11	-	-	-	20	36	458	73	28,707	405,501
South 24 Parganas district	4	21	9	59	1	5	-	217	316	4,090	691	197,837	4,397,890

Note: The district data does not include data for portions of South 24 Parganas district functioning under Kolkata Municipal Corporation. The number of doctors exclude private bodies.

Medical facilities in Baruipur subdivision are as follows:

Hospitals: (Name, location, beds)

- Baruipur Subdivisional Hospital, Baruipur, 250 beds
- Pranati Bhattacharya Smriti Matrisadan, Sonarpur, 20 beds
- Jaynagar Majilpur Maternity Home, Jaynagar Majilpur, 10 beds
- Jaynagar Hospital, Jaynagar Majilpur, 2 beds

Rural Hospitals: (Name, CD block, location, beds)

- Sonarpur Rural Hospital, Sonarpur CD block, Sonarpur, 25 beds
- Padmerhat Rural Hospital, Jaynagar I CD block, Padmerhat, 30 beds
- Sri Ramakrishna Rural Hospital, Jaynagar II CD block, Nimpith, 30 beds
- Jaynagar Rural Hospital, Kultali CD block, Jamtala, 25 beds
- Nalmuri Rural Hospital, Bhanagar I CD block, Nalmuri, 30 beds
- Jirongachhi Rural Hospital, Bhangar II CD Block, Jirongachhi, 30 beds

Block Primary Health Centres: (Name, CD block, location, beds)

- Hariharpur Block Primary Health Centre, Baruipur CD block, Hariharpur, PO Mallikpur, 10 beds

Primary Health Centres: (CD block-wise)(CD block, PHC location, beds)

- Sonarpur CD block: Kalikapur (10), Fartabad (PO Garia) (6), Langolberia (PO Dakshin Govindapur) (6), Kheadaha (6)
- Baruipur CD block: Indrapala (PO Kudrali) (6), Panchgachhia (PO Gocharan) (6)
- Jaynagar I CD block: Momrejgarh (Goalberia) (PO Srikrishnanagar) (6), Purba Gabberia (6)
- Jaynagar II CD block; Naya pukuria (6), Mayahauri (6), Nalgora (PO Sonatikri) (10)
- Kultali CD block: Kantamari (6), Maipit (6), Kaikhali (Gopalganj) (10), Bhubaneswari (6)
- Bhangar I CD block: Bhatipota (PO Beconta) (6)
- Bhangar II CD block: Bhnagar (10), Tona (PO Polarhat) (6)

== Electoral constituencies ==
Lok Sabha (parliamentary) and Vidhan Sabha (state assembly) constituencies in Baruipur subdivision were as follows:

Lok Sabha constituency	Reservation	Vidhan Sabha constituency	Reservation	CD Block and/or Gram panchayats and/or municipal areas
Jaynagar	Reserved for SC	Kultali	Reserved for SC	Kultali CD Block, and Baishata, Chuprijhara, Manirtat and Nalgora gram panchayats of Jaynagar II CD Block
		Jaynagar	Reserved for SC	Baharu Kshetra, Dakshin Barasat, Harinarayanpur, Rajapur Korabeg, Sripur and Uttar Durgapur gram panchayats of Jaynagar I CD Block, Beledurganagar, Futigoda, Gardoani, Mayahauri, Mayda and Sahajadapur gram panchayats of Jaynagar II CD Block, and Jaynagar Majilpur municipality
Jadavpur	None	Baruipur Purba	Reserved for SC	Begumpur, Belegachhia, Brindakhali, Champahati, Hardhah, Nabagram, Ramnagar-I, Ramnagar-II and South Garia gram panchayats of Baruipur CD Block, and Bamangachhi, Chaltaberia, Dhosa Chandaneswar, Jangalia, Khakurdaha and Narayanitala gram panchayats of Jaynagar I CD Block
		Baruipur Paschim	None	Dhapdhapi-I, Dhapdhapi-II, Hariharpur, Kalyanpur, Madarat, Mallikpur, Shankarpur-I, Shankarpur-II, Shikharbali-I and Shikharbali-II gram panchayats of Baruipur CD Block, and Baruipur municipality
		Sonarpur Dakshin	None	Kalikapur-I, Kalikapur-II, Langalberia, Poleghat, Pratapnagar and Sonarpur-II gram panchayats of Sonarpur CD Block, and Ward Nos. 8–24 of Rajpur Sonarpur municipality
		Sonarpur Uttar	None	Banhooghly-I, Banhooghly-II, Kamrabad, Kheyadaha-I and Kheyadaha-II gram panchayats of Sonarpur CD Block, and Ward Nos. 1–7 and 25–35 of Rajpur Sonarpur municipality
		Bhangar	None	Bhangar II CD Block, and Jagulgachhi, Narayanpur and Pranganj gram panchayats of Bhangar I CD Block
