= Jaynagar Majilpur railway station =

Railway Station in West Bengal, India

Jaynagar Majilpur
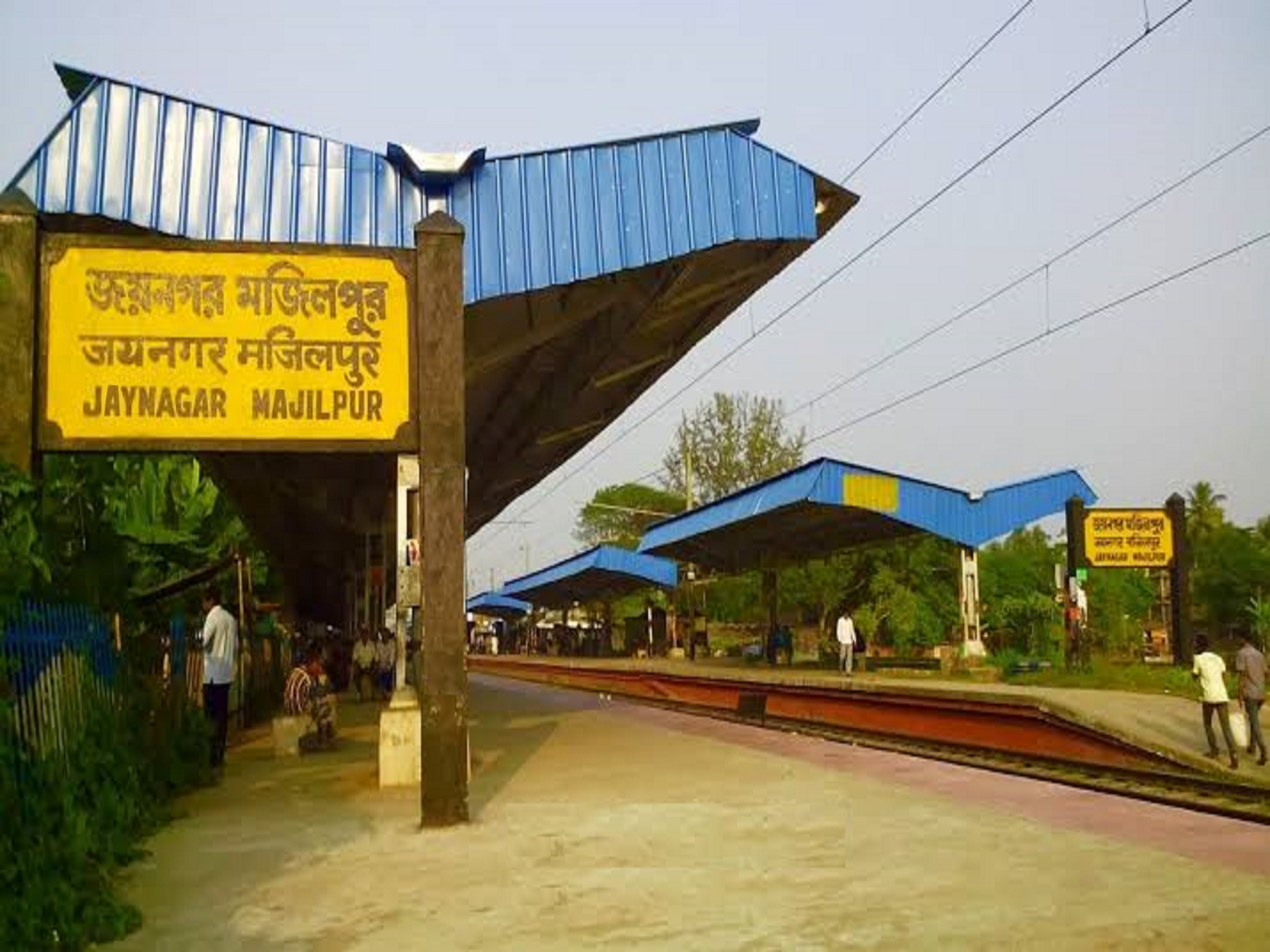
- Jaynagar Majilpur Railway Station

General information
- Location: Jaynagar Majilpur, South 24 Parganas, West Bengal; India
- Coordinates: 22.1695702°N 88.4161432°E
- Elevation: 8 metres (26 ft)
- System: Kolkata Suburban Railway Station
- Owner: Indian Railways
- Operator: Eastern Railway
- Line: Main line
- Platforms: 2
- Tracks: 3
- Connections: Bus stand

Construction
- Structure type: Standard (on-ground station)
- Parking: Available
- Cycle facilities: Available
- Accessible: Available

Other information
- Status: Functioning
- Station code: JNM
- Zone(s): Eastern Railway
- Division(s): Sealdah

History
- Opened: 1882; 144 years ago
- Electrified: 1965–66
- Former names: Eastern Bengal Railway
Services
Preceding station	Kolkata Suburban Railway	Following station
Mathurapur Road towards Namkhana	Sealdah South Main line	Baharu towards Sealdah
Route map
Location

Jaynagar Majilpur railway station is a Kolkata Suburban Railway Station on the Main line, with an approximate 49 kilometres (30 mi) distance from the Sealdah railway station. It is under the jurisdiction of the Eastern Railway zone of Indian Railways. Jaynagar Majilpur railway station, is one of the busiest railway stations in the Sealdah railway division. More than 30 pairs of EMU local trains pass through the railway station on a daily basis. It is situated in South 24 Parganas district in the Indian state of West Bengal. Jaynagar Majilpur railway station serves Jaynagar Majilpur and the surrounding areas.

== Geography ==
Jaynagar Majilpur railway station is located at 22°10′10″N 88°24′58″E. It has an average elevation of 8 metres (26 ft).

== History ==
In 1882, the Eastern Bengal Railway constructed a 1,676 mm (5 ft 6 in)-wide broad-gauge railway from Sonarpur Junction to Jaynagar Majilpur.

== Electrification ==
Electrification from Sonarpur Junction to Jaynagar Majilpur was completed with 25 kV AC overhead system in 1965–66.

== Station complex ==
The platform is very much well sheltered. The station possesses many facilities including water and sanitation. It is well connected to the SH-1. There is a proper approach road to this station.
