= Purba Gabberia =

- Village
- Location in West Bengal Location in India
- Coordinates: 22.2526°N 88.5251°E
- Country: India
- State: West Bengal
- District: South 24 Parganas
- CD Block: Jaynagar I

Area
  - Total: 8.31 km^{2} (3.21 sq mi)
- Elevation: 8 m (26 ft)

Population (2011)
  - Total: 12,283
  - Density: 1,480/km^{2} (3,830/sq mi)

Languages
  - Official: Bengali
  - Additional official: English
- Time zone: UTC+5:30 (IST)
- PIN: 743396
- Telephone code: +91 3218
- Vehicle registration: WB-19 to WB-22, WB-95 to WB-99
- Lok Sabha constituency: Jadavpur
- Vidhan Sabha constituency: Baruipur Purba (SC)
- Website: www.s24pgs.gov.in

Purba Gabberia is a village within the jurisdiction of the Jaynagar Majilpur police station in the Jaynagar I CD block in the Baruipur subdivision of the South 24 Parganas district in the Indian state of West Bengal.

== Geography ==
Purba Gabberia is located at 22°15′09″N 88°31′30″E. It has an average elevation of 8 metres (26 ft).

== Demographics ==
As per 2011 Census of India, Purba Gabberia had a total population of 12,283.

== Transport ==
Gocharan-Dhosa Road links Purba Gabberia to the State Highway 1.

Gocharan railway station is located nearby.

== Healthcare ==
There is a primary health centre, with 6 beds, at Purba Gabberia.
