= Bantra =

- Village
- Location in West Bengal Location in India
- Coordinates: 22.2048°N 88.5154°E
- Country: India
- State: West Bengal
- District: South 24 Parganas
- CD Block: Jaynagar I

Area
  - Total: 7.21 km^{2} (2.78 sq mi)
- Elevation: 8 m (26 ft)

Population (2011)
  - Total: 12,508
  - Density: 1,730/km^{2} (4,490/sq mi)

Languages
  - Official: Bengali
  - Additional official: English
- Time zone: UTC+5:30 (IST)
- PIN: 743337
- Telephone code: +91 3218
- Vehicle registration: WB-19 to WB-22, WB-95 to WB-99
- Lok Sabha constituency: Jaynagar (SC)
- Vidhan Sabha constituency: Jaynagar (SC)
- Website: www.s24pgs.gov.in

Bantra is a village within the jurisdiction of the Jaynagar Majilpur police station in the Jaynagar I CD block in the Baruipur subdivision of the South 24 Parganas district in the Indian state of West Bengal.

== Geography ==
Bantra is located at 22°12′17″N 88°30′55″E. It has an average elevation of 8 metres (26 ft).

== Demographics ==
As per 2011 Census of India, Bantra had a total population of 12,508.

== Transport ==
A short stretch of local roads link Bantra to the State Highway 1.

Dakshin Barasat railway station is located nearby.

== Healthcare ==
Padmerhat Rural Hospital, with 30 beds, at Padmerhat, is the major government medical facility in the Jaynagar I CD block.
