= Gocharan =

- Village
- Location in West Bengal Location in India
- Coordinates: 22.2799°N 88.4540°E
- Country: India
- State: West Bengal
- District: South 24 Parganas
- CD Block: Baruipur

Area
  - Total: 0.53 km^{2} (0.20 sq mi)
- Elevation: 9 m (30 ft)

Population (2011)
  - Total: 1,147
  - Density: 2,200/km^{2} (5,600/sq mi)

Languages
  - Official: Bengali
  - Additional official: English
- Time zone: UTC+5:30 (IST)
- PIN: 743391
- Telephone code: +91 33
- Vehicle registration: WB-19 to WB-22, WB-95 to WB-99
- Lok Sabha constituency: Jadavpur
- Vidhan Sabha constituency: Baruipur Purba (SC)
- Website: www.s24pgs.gov.in

Gocharan is a village within the jurisdiction of the Baruipur police station in the Baruipur CD block in the Baruipur subdivision of the South 24 Parganas district in the Indian state of West Bengal.

== Geography ==
Gocharan is located at 22°16′48″N 88°27′14″E. It has an average elevation of 9 metres (30 ft).

== Demographics ==
As per 2011 Census of India, Gocharan had a total population of 1,147.

== Transport ==
Gocharan is on the State Highway 1.

Gocharan railway station is on the Sealdah–Namkhana line of the Kolkata Suburban Railway system.

=== Commuters ===
With the electrification of the railways, suburban traffic has grown tremendously since the 1960s. As of 2005–06, more than 1.7 million (17 lakhs) commuters use the Kolkata Suburban Railway system daily. After the partition of India, refugees from erstwhile East Pakistan and Bangladesh had a strong impact on the development of urban areas in the periphery of Kolkata. The new immigrants depended on Kolkata for their livelihood, thus increasing the number of commuters. Eastern Railway runs 1,272 EMU trains daily.

== Healthcare ==
There is a primary health centre, with 6 beds, at Panchgachhia (PO Gocharan).
