= Sripur, Jaynagar =

Sripur
- Village
- Location in West Bengal Location in India
- Coordinates: 22.1938°N 88.4537°E
- Country: India
- State: West Bengal
- District: South 24 Parganas
- CD Block: Jaynagar I

Area
  - Total: 0.98 km^{2} (0.38 sq mi)
- Elevation: 8 m (26 ft)

Population (2011)
  - Total: 2,668
  - Density: 2,700/km^{2} (7,100/sq mi)

Languages
  - Official: Bengali
  - Additional official: English
- Time zone: UTC+5:30 (IST)
- PIN: 743372
- Telephone code: +91 3218
- Vehicle registration: WB-19 to WB-22, WB-95 to WB-99
- Lok Sabha constituency: Jaynagar (SC)
- Vidhan Sabha constituency: Jaynagar (SC)
- Website: www.s24pgs.gov.in

Sripur is a village and a gram panchayat within the jurisdiction of the Jaynagar Majilpur police station in the Jaynagar I CD block in the Baruipur subdivision of the South 24 Parganas district in the Indian state of West Bengal.

== Geography ==
Sripur is located at 22°11′38″N 88°27′13″E. It has an average elevation of 8 metres (26 ft).

== Demographics ==
As per 2011 Census of India, Sripur had a total population of 2,668.

== Transport ==
A short stretch of local roads link Sripur to the State Highway 1.

Baharu railway station is located nearby.

== Healthcare ==
Padmerhat Rural Hospital, with 30 beds, at Padmerhat, is the major government medical facility in the Jaynagar I CD block.
