= Bivas Sardar =

Indian politician

Member of the West Bengal Legislative Assembly
- Incumbent
- Assumed office 2 May 2021
- Preceded by: Nirmal Mondal
- Constituency: Baruipur Purba

Personal details
- Party: AITC
- Profession: Politician

Bivas Sardar is also known as Vobo. He is an Indian politician member of All India Trinamool Congress. He is an MLA, elected from the Baruipur Purba constituency in the 2021 West Bengal Legislative Assembly election.
