= Harinarayanpur, Kushtia =

Harinarayanpur হরিনারায়ণপুর
- Village and Bazaar
- Location within Khulna division Location within Bangladesh
- Coordinates: 23.755080°N 89.138990°E
- Country: Bangladesh
- Division: Khulna
- District: Kushtia
- Upazila: Kushtia Sadar
- Thana: Islamic University
- Union: Harinarayanpur Union

Area
  - Total: 9.3 km^{2} (3.6 sq mi)

Population (2022)
  - Total: 20,958
  - Density: 2,300/km^{2} (5,800/sq mi)

Harinarayanpur (Bengali: হরিনারায়ণপুর) is a village, Bazaar and the headquarters of Harinarayanpur Union, situated on the bank of the Kaliganga River in Kushtia District. The Harinarayanpur Hat is a growth center located in the Purba Abdalpur mouza.

Muhammad Mansuruddin initially identified Harinarayanpur as the birthplace of Lalon, though he later changed his opinion. It was once a center of the weaving industry.

== Geography ==
Harinarayanpur is administratively located in Harinarayanpur Union under Islamic University Thana.

Mouza	Area	Mahalla/Village
Harinarayanpur	1,275 acres (5.16 km^{2})	Shibpur
Harinarayanpur	1,275 acres (5.16 km^{2})	Berbaradi
Harinarayanpur	1,275 acres (5.16 km^{2})	Harinarayanpur
Harinarayanpur	1,275 acres (5.16 km^{2})	Padmanagar
Purba Abdalpur	1,035 acres (4.19 km^{2})	Purba Abdalpur

Harinarayanpur Bazar is located in the Harinarayanpur and Purba Abdalpur mouzas. It is bounded by Dhalnagar-Pratappur and Jangali mouzas to the east, Bilkarari and Lakshmipur mouzas to the west, Madhpur and Mrittikapara mouzas to the north, and Lakshmipur, Kittinagar and Purba Abdalpur mouzas to the south.

== History ==
=== Harinarayanpur Shahi Mosque ===
Harinarayanpur Shahi Mosque is a mosque built during the Mughal period, named after Shah Shuja, the son of Emperor Shah Jahan. The mosque is small and rectangular in shape, with three domes. According to local tradition, Shah Shuja built the mosque while staying in Harinarayanpur during his conflict with Aurangzeb.

=== British India ===
During the period of British India, Harinarayanpur was under Bhadalia Thana. After the abolition of Bhadalia Thana, it came under Kushtia Thana. The Harinarayanpur Union Board was later formed centering the area.

On 7 June 1927, a private ferry ghat in Harinarayanpur and a private sub-ferry ghat in Padmanagar were nationalized.

==== Peasant movement ====
In December 1938, the first district conference of the Nadia District branch of the Bengal Provincial Krishak Sabha was held in Harinarayanpur. It was a significant event in the people's history of Nadia district.

=== Bangladesh Liberation War ===
During the Bangladesh Liberation War, the Pakistan Army established a camp in Harinarayanpur. The camp was used for killings and torture.

=== Post-independence period ===
After the establishment of Islamic University, Bangladesh in 1979, Kushtia Thana was divided and Islamic University Thana was formed. Since then, Harinarayanpur has remained under Islamic University Thana.

== Demographics ==
According to the 2022 Bangladesh census, Harinarayanpur (Note: Harinarayanpur and Purba Abdalpur mouzas) had a total of 5,356 households and a population of 20,958. Of the population, 10,335 were male and 10,603 were female.

According to the 2011 Bangladesh census, Harinarayanpur had 4,634 households and a population of 18,996. Among them, 9,641 were male and 9,355 were female.

Mouza	Mahalla/Village	Population		Households	
Mouza	Mahalla/Village	2011	2022	2011	2022
Harinarayanpur	Berbaradi	3,960	3,847	919	978
Harinarayanpur	Harinarayanpur	4,227	5,898	1,044	1,497
Harinarayanpur	Padmanagar	1,720	1,901	426	479
Harinarayanpur	Shibpur	3,591	3,013	871	820
Purba Abdalpur	Purba Abdalpur	5,498	6,299	1,374	1,582

== Education ==
=== Educational institutions ===
- Dwarkadas Agarowala Mohila College – a higher secondary educational institution.
- Harinarayanpur Multilateral High School (1891)
- Harinarayanpur Secondary Girls' School – an MPO-listed secondary girls' school established in 1973. It received recognition in 1980.
- Harinarayanpur Islamia Dakhil Madrasa – an MPO-listed dakhil madrasa. It was established in 1996 and received recognition in 2003.
- Harinarayanpur Government Primary School
- Harinarayanpur Girls' Government Primary School
- Padmanagar Government Primary School
- Berbaradi Government Primary School
- Shibpur Government Primary School
- Purba Abdalpur Government Primary School

== Economy ==
Harinarayanpur has two markets that are officially leased by the government. These are Harinarayanpur Toha Hat and Harinarayanpur Cattle Hat.

Lease value of markets in Harinarayanpur in different years
Year	Notice date	Government value (BDT)		Source
Year	Notice date	Toha Hat	Cattle Hat	Source
2025	9 February	884,676	63,247	
2024	12 February	761,044	46,322	
2023	-	-		
2022	-	-		
2021	18 February	688,412	37,895	
2020	9 February	667,106	29,627	
2019	12 February	641,737	27,684	
2018	5 February	636,185	24,733	
2017	7 February	609,033	22,807	

== Notable people ==
- Upendranath Bhattacharya – Indian writer

== Gallery ==
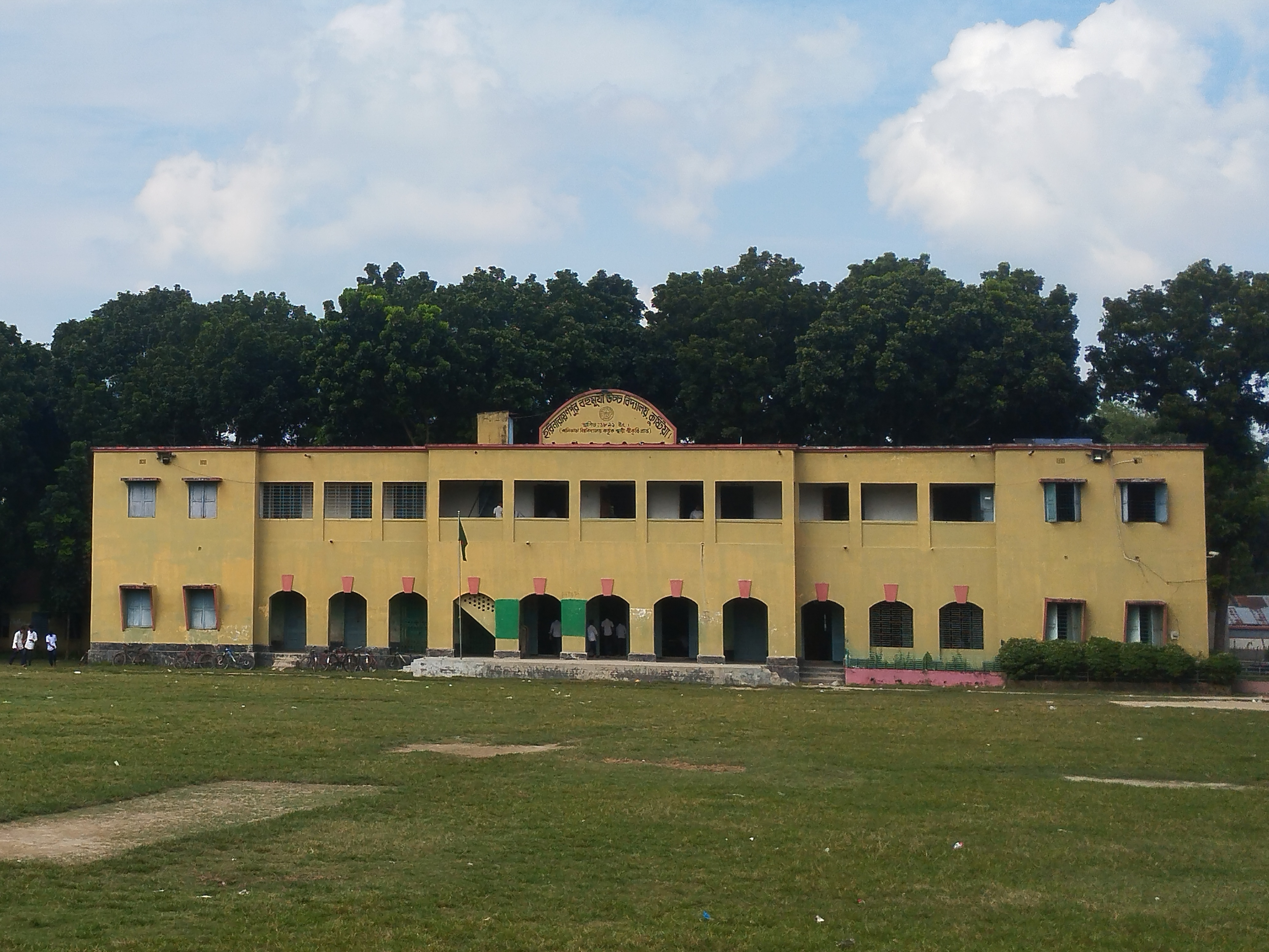
Harinarayanpur Multipurpose High School

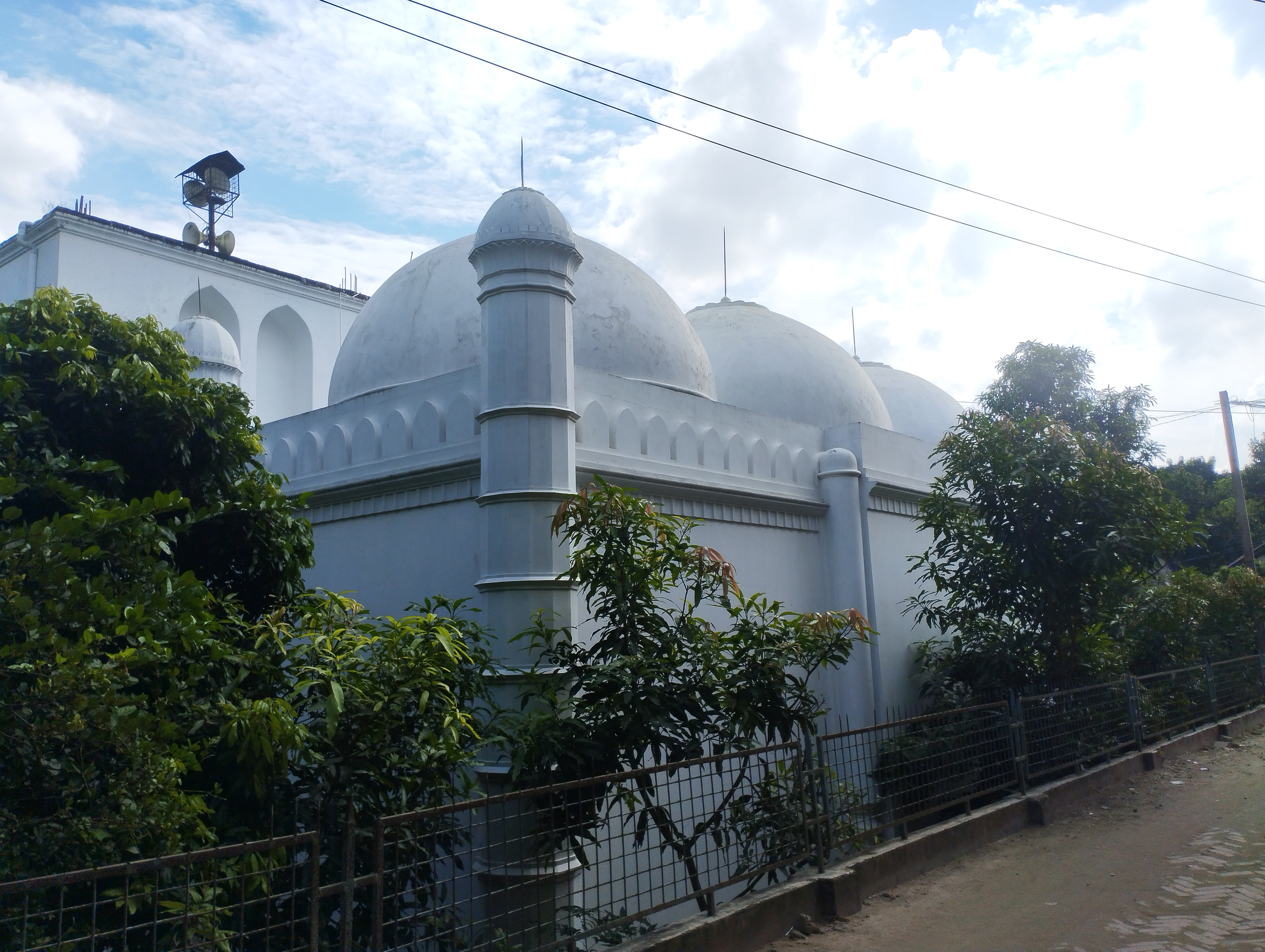
Harinarayanpur Shahi Mosque

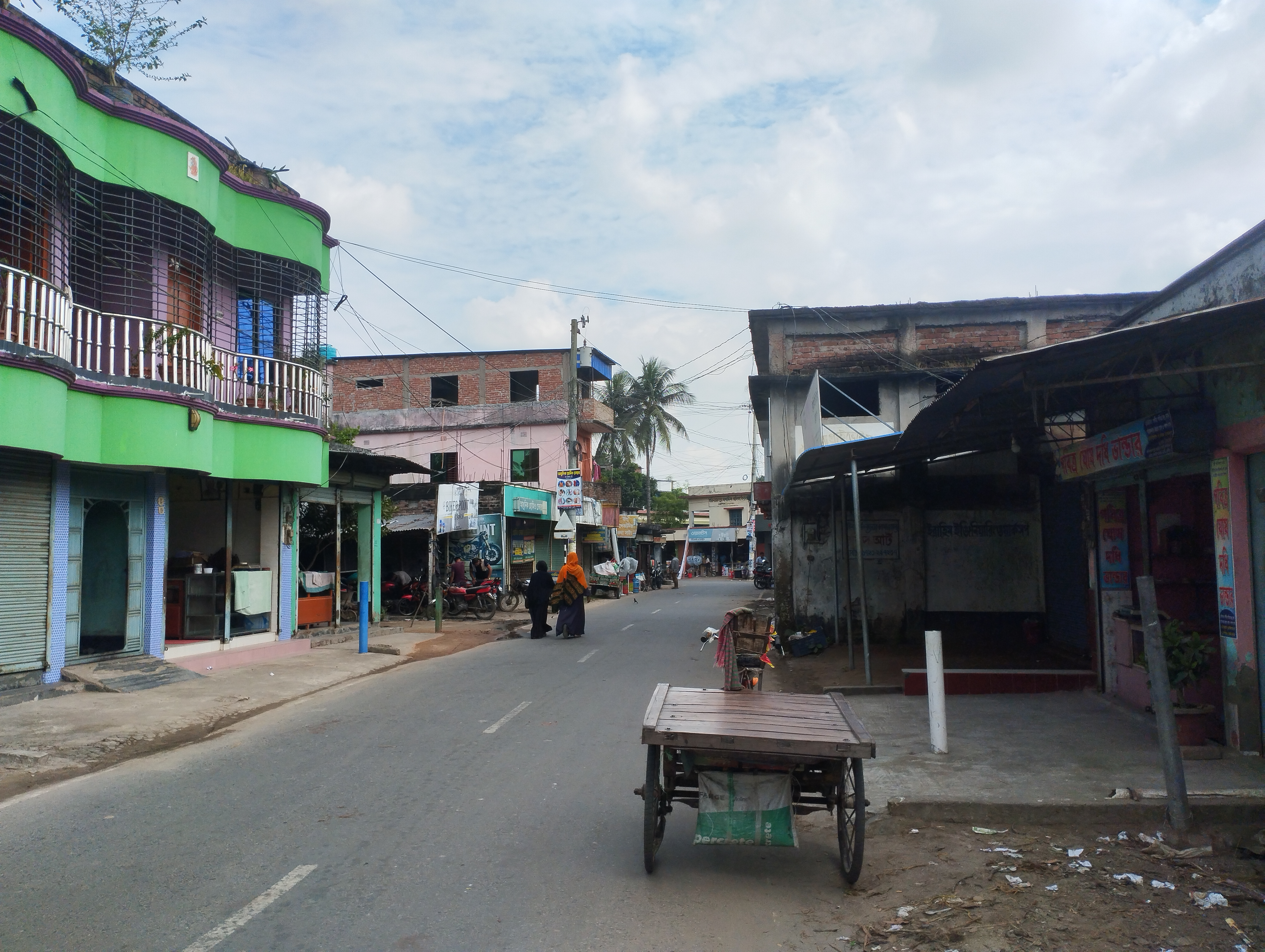
Balika Biddalay Morr
