= Harinarayanpur Shahi Mosque =

Mosque in Kushtia, Bangladesh

- হরিনারায়ণপুর শাহী মসজিদ
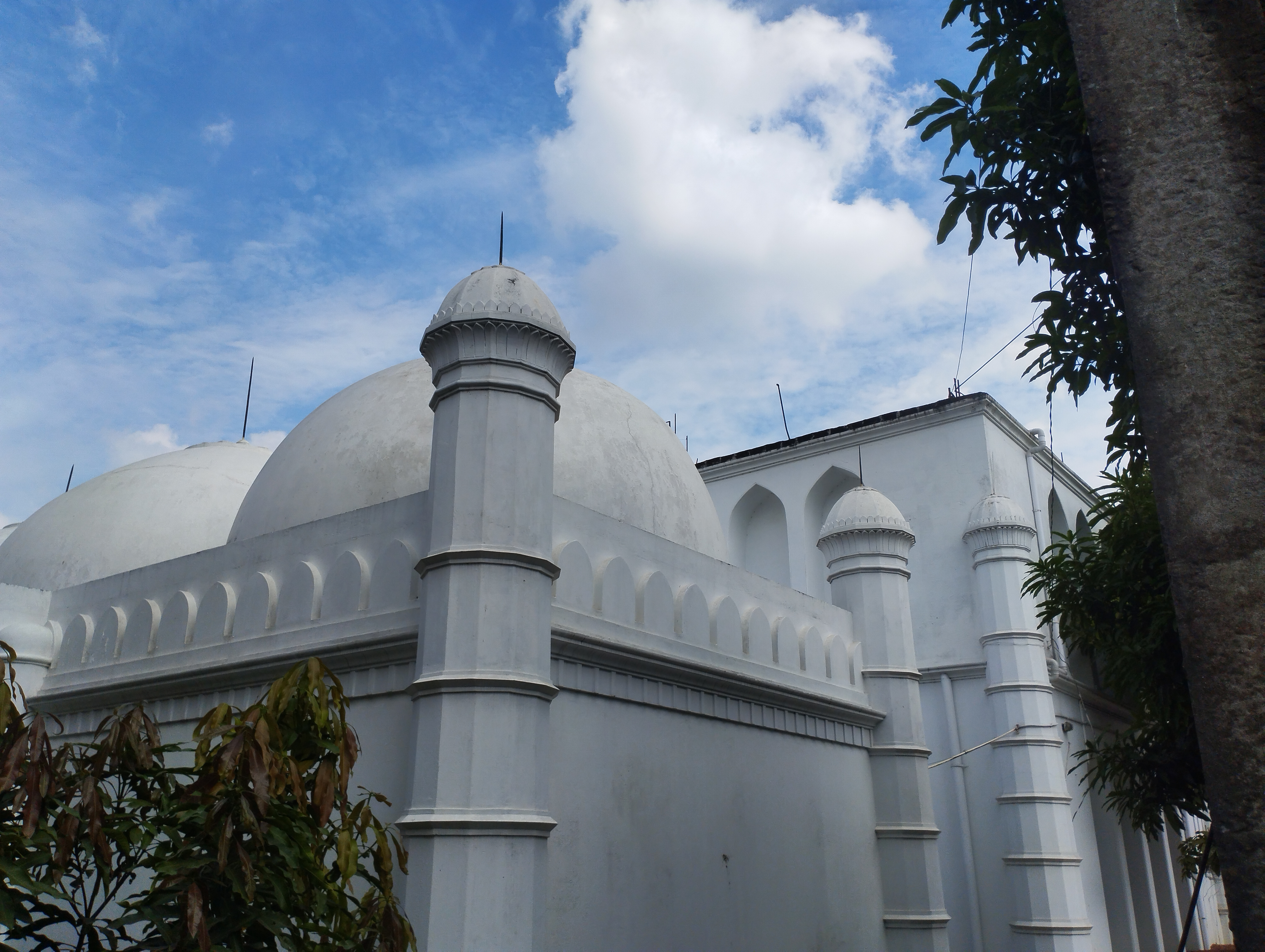

- Location of the mosque in Bangladesh

Religion
- Affiliation: Islam
- Ecclesiastical or organizational status: Mosque
- Status: Active

Location
- Location: Kushtia District, Khulna Division
- Country: Bangladesh
- Interactive map of Harinarayanpur Shahi Mosque
- Coordinates: 23°45′18″N 89°08′17″E

Architecture
- Type: Mosque architecture
- Style: Mughal
- Founder: Shah Shuja
- Groundbreaking: 1639 CE
- Completed: c. 1639-1660

Specifications
- Capacity: 170 worshipers
- Length: 13.71 m (45.0 ft)
- Width: 5.18 m (17.0 ft)
- Dome: Three
- Dome height (outer): 3.6 m (12 ft)

The Harinarayanpur Shahi Mosque (Bengali: হরিনারায়ণপুর শাহী মসজিদ), also known as Harinarayanpur Shah Shuja Mosque (Bengali: হরিনারায়ণপুর শাহ সুজা মসজিদ), is a mosque located in Harinarayanpur of Harinarayanpur Union of Kushtia Sadar Upazila of Kushtia district, in the Khulna Division of Bangladesh. The exact date of establishment of the Mughal era mosque, associated with Shah Shuja, is unknown. The mosque is some 21 kilometres (13 mi) from Kushtia, via Kushtia-Jhenaidah highway.

== Architecture ==
The mosque has three domes and is rectangular in east–west direction. The length of the mosque is 13.71 metres (45.0 ft) and the width is 5.18 metres (17.0 ft). The entire mosque is built of terracotta bricks and lime mortar. According to the Mughal mosque construction method, the three domes of the mosque are of equal volume and height. The height of the domes is 3.6 metres (12 ft). There are five doors to enter the mosque. The central entrance door is relatively higher than the other doors with a height of approximately 1.9 metres (6 ft 3 in) and a width of approximately 1.19 metres (3 ft 11 in).

The mosque has two rows where twenty worshipers can offer prayers in each row. In 2000, five more qatars were added with the construction of new buildings along with mosques, each qatar can accommodate 26 worshipers. According to this, the present capacity of the mosque is 170 worshipers.

== See also ==
- Islam in Bangladesh
- List of mosques in Bangladesh
