= Harinarayanpur Multilateral High School =

Harinarayanpur Bahumukhi High School
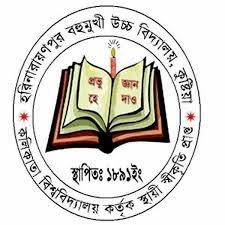

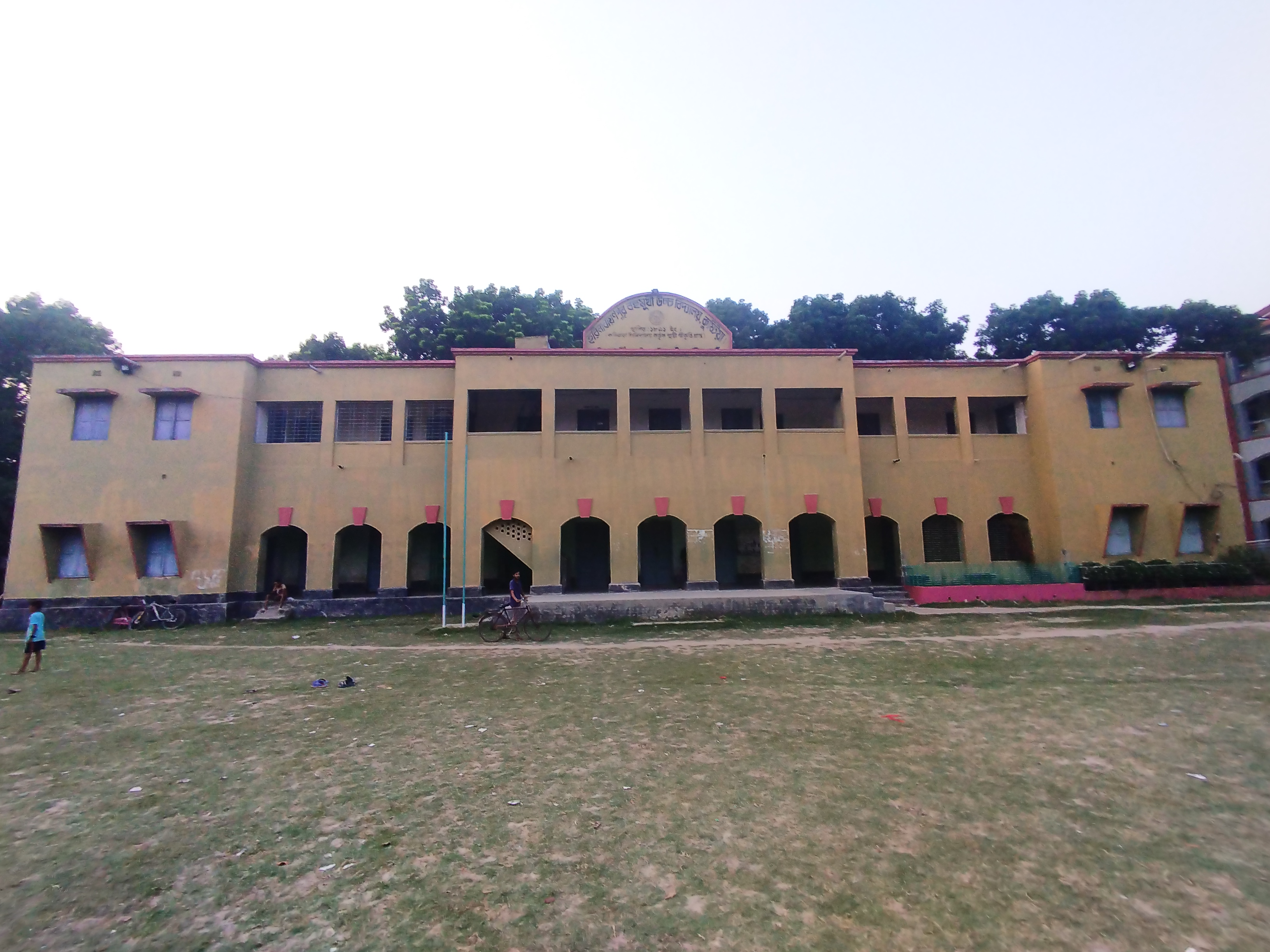

Location
- Harinarayanpur-Lakshipur Road; Harinarayanpur Union, Kushtia Sadar Upazila; Bangladesh
- Coordinates: 23.7580°N 89.1401°E

Information
- Other name: Harinarayanpur Secondary School
- Former names: Harinarayanpur High School, Harinarayanpur H.E. School
- Type: Secondary School
- Established: 1891; 135 years ago
- School board: Board of Intermediate and Secondary Education, Jashore
- School code: 117757 (EIIN)
- Language: Bengali
- Campus type: Rural
- Website: harinarayanpursecondaryschool.jessoreboard.gov.bd

Harinarayanpur Bahumukhi High School or Harinarayanpur Multipurpose High School (Bengali: হরিনারায়ণপুর বহুমুখী উচ্চ বিদ্যালয়) is a secondary school located in Harinarayanpur of Sadar Upazila of Kushtia District.

== Educational activities ==
The school is under the Jessore Board at secondary level.

== Gallery ==
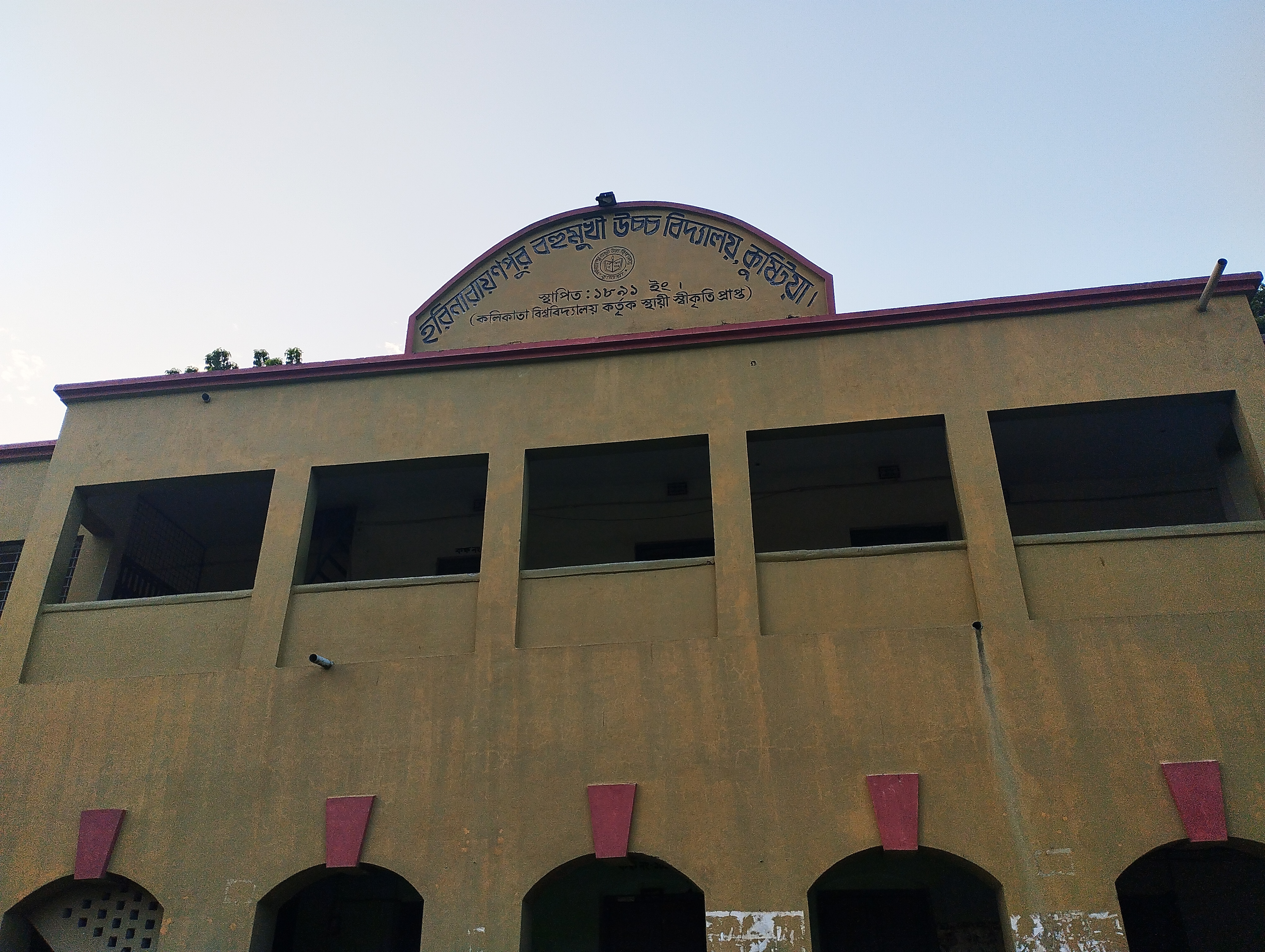

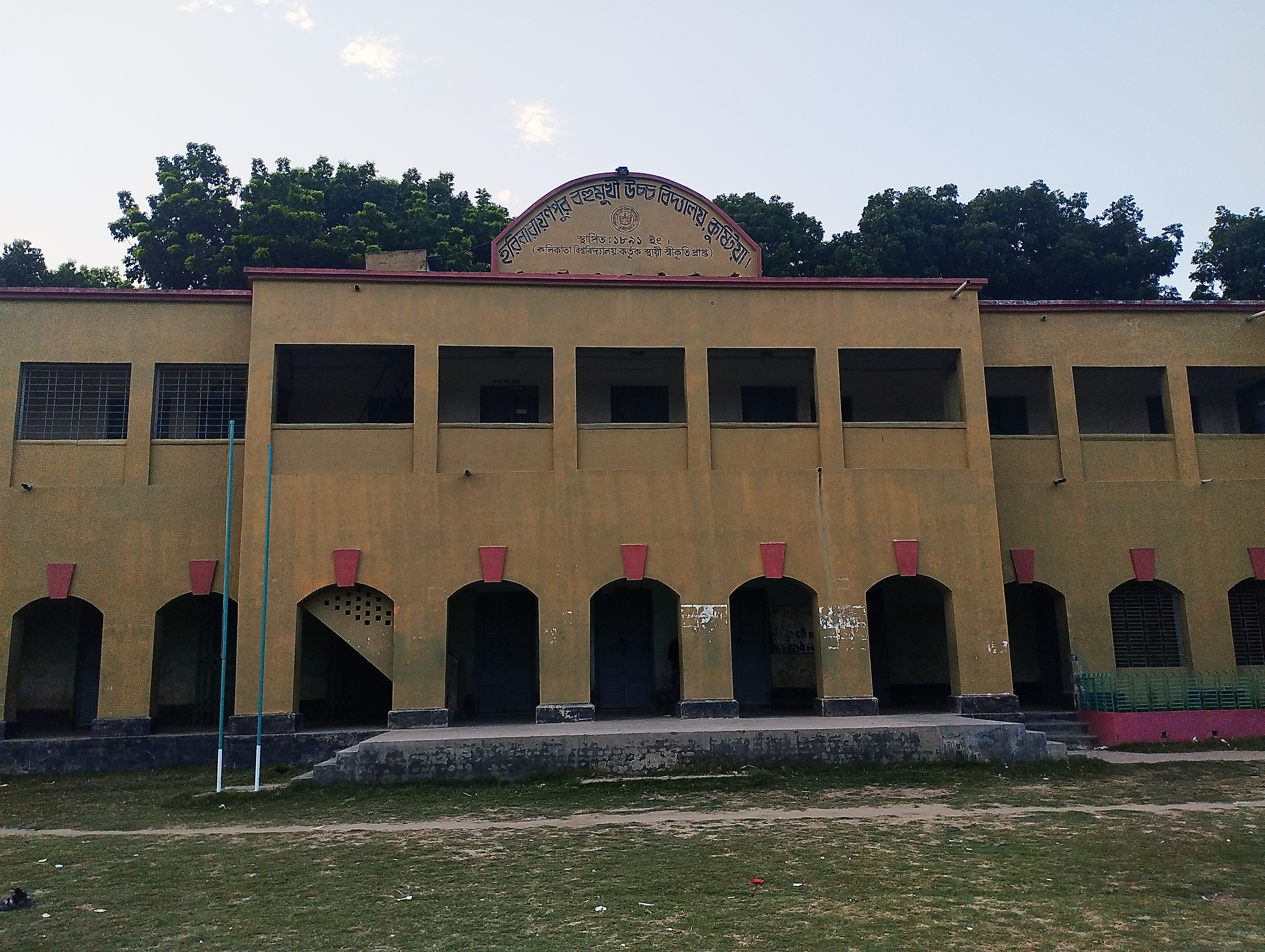

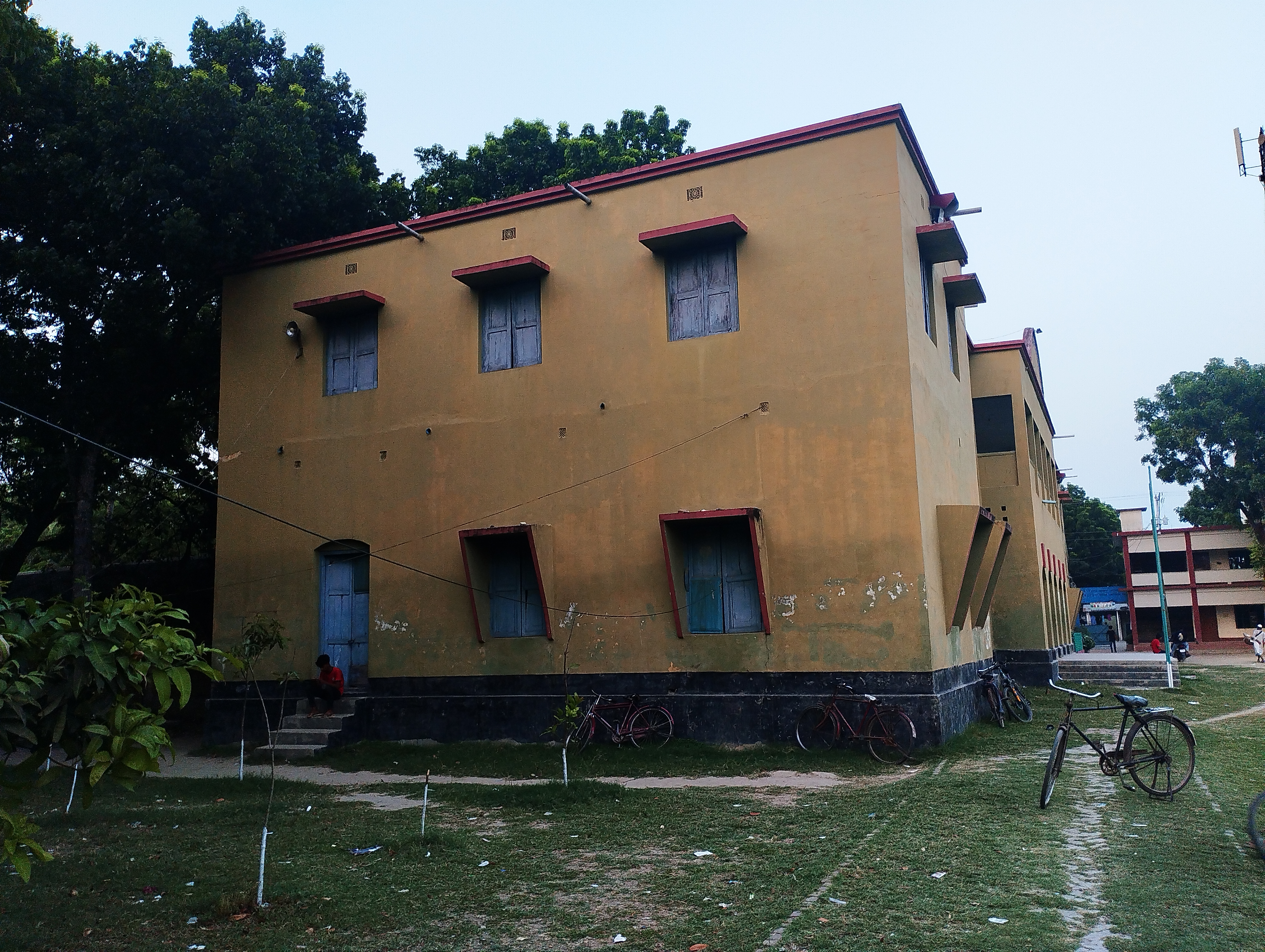

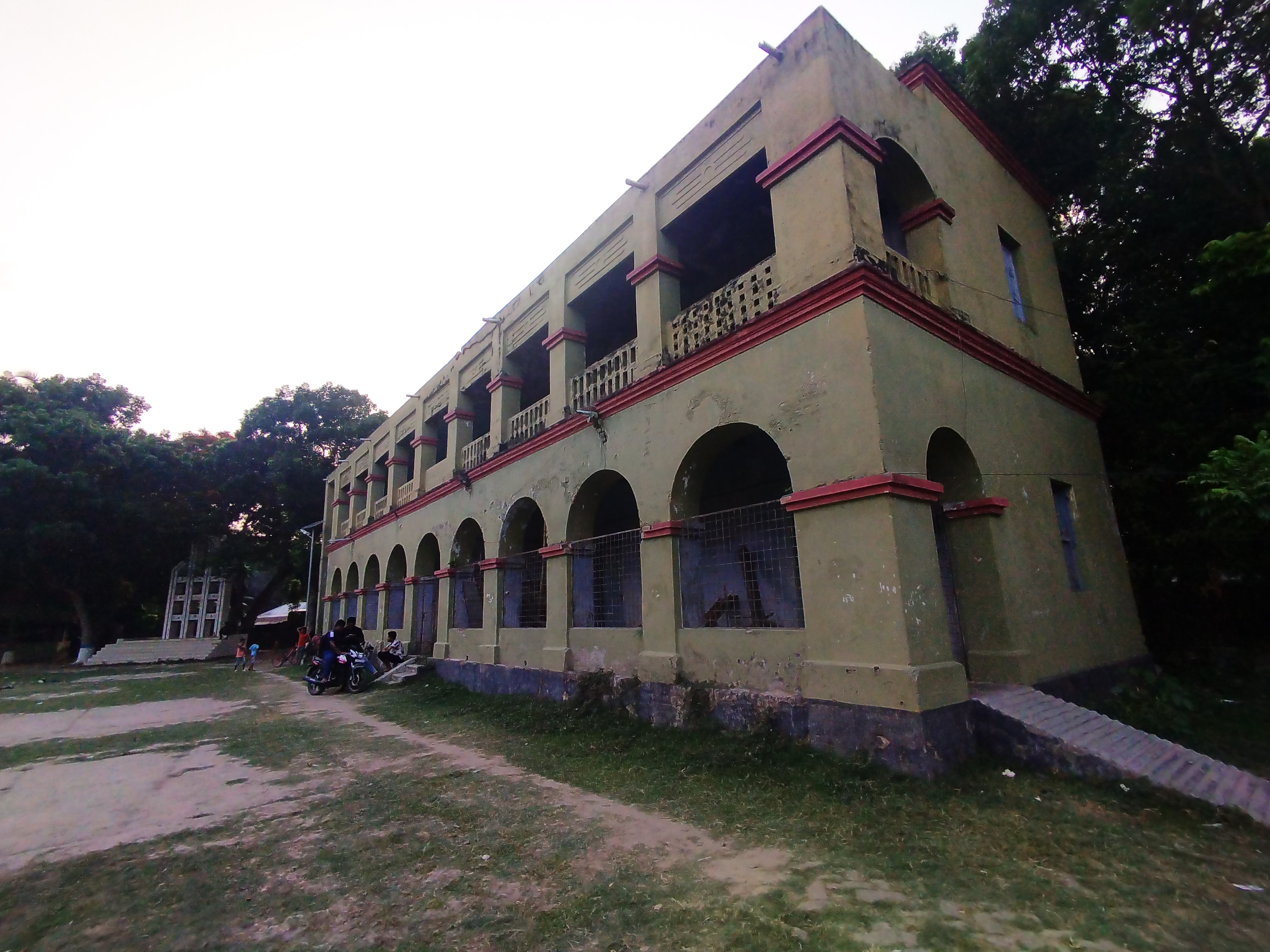

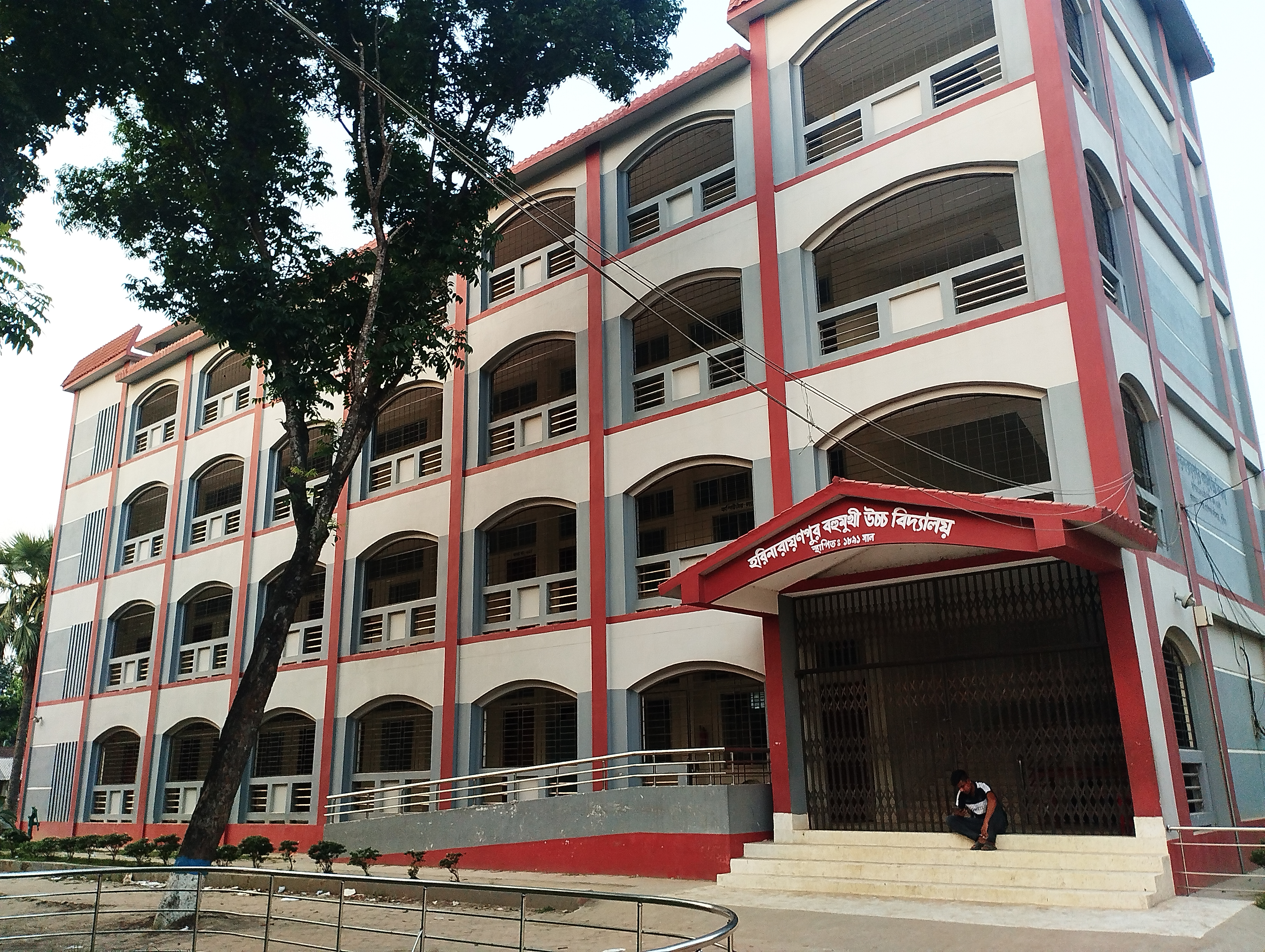

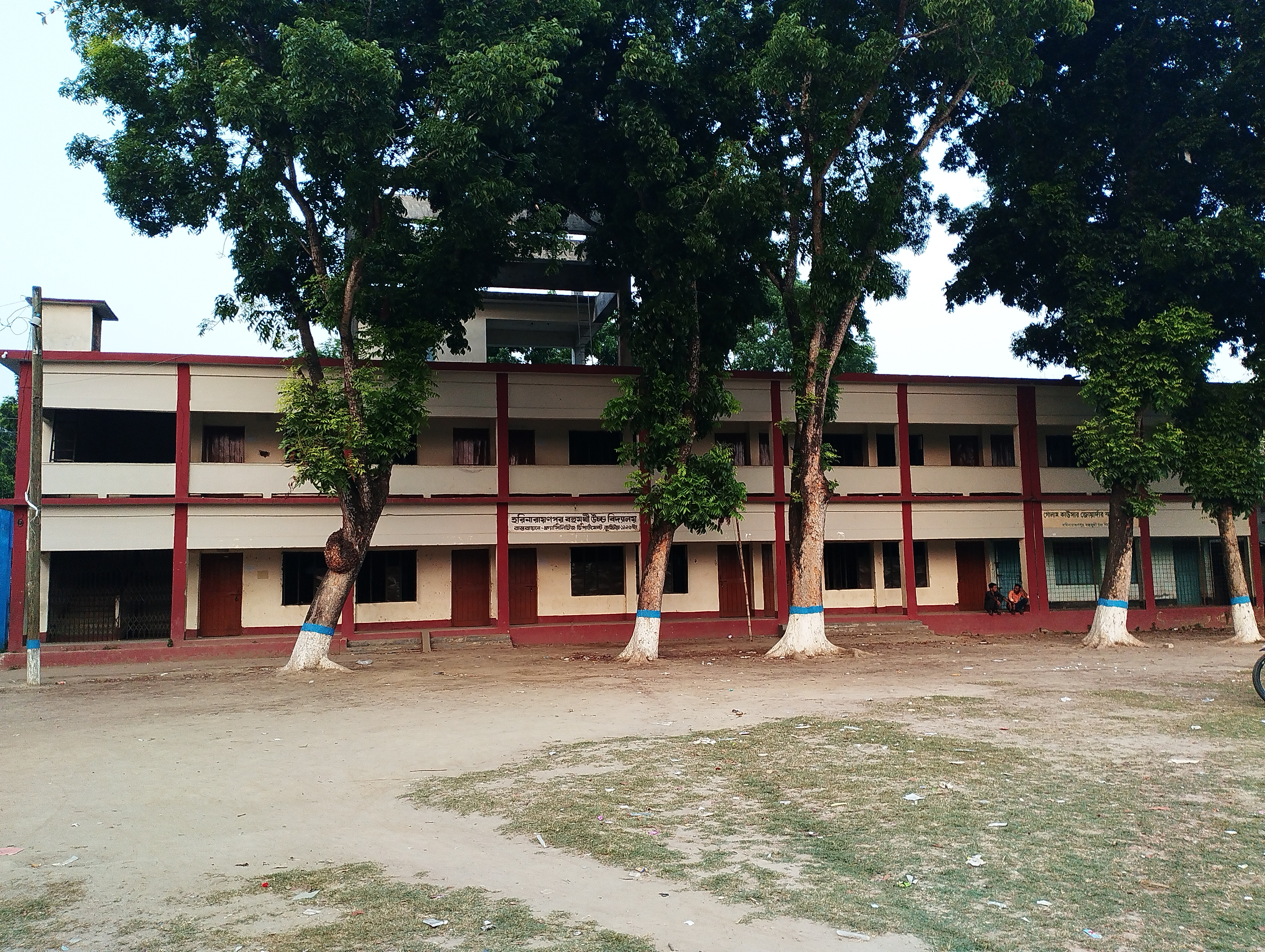

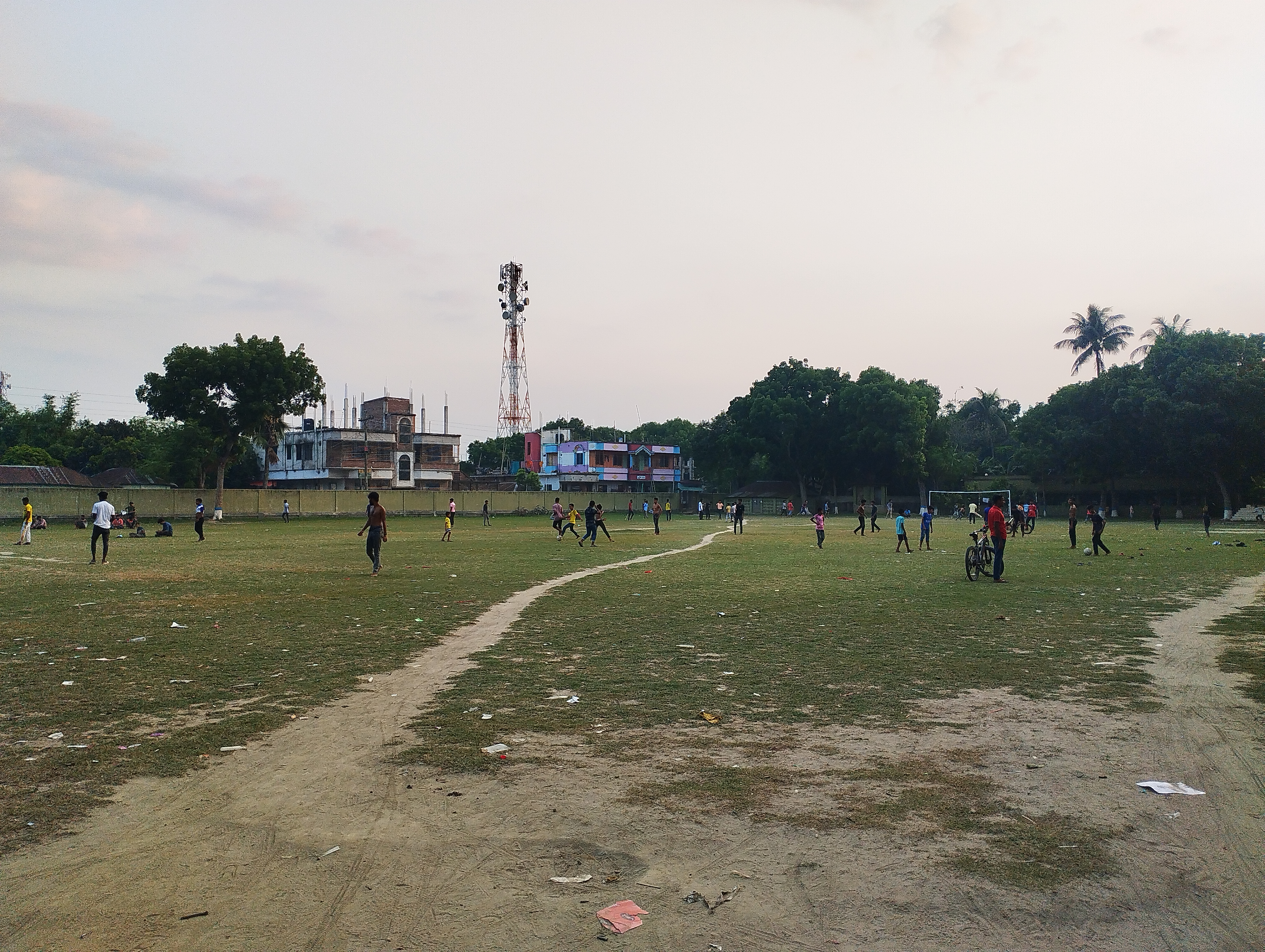
School playground

== Notes and references ==
=== General references ===
- মোঃ রেজাউল করিম (Md. Rezaul Karim) (December 2022). কুষ্টিয়ার প্রত্ননিদর্শন [Archeology of Kushtia] (in Bengali) (1st ed.). Dhaka: গতিধারা (Gatidhara). pp. 186–189. ISBN 978-984-8950-41-8.
