= Jaynagar I =

Community Development Block in West Bengal, India

- Community Development Block
- Location of Jaynagar I community development block in South 24 Parganas district
- Coordinates: 22.1751965°N 88.4200762°E
- Country: India
- State: West Bengal
- Division: Presidency
- District: South 24 Parganas
- Subdivision: Baruipur
- Headquarters: Baharu

Government
  - Gram Panchayats: Baharu Kshetra, Bamangachhi, Chaltaberia, Dakshin Barasat, Dhosa Chandaneswar, Harinarayanpur, Jangalia, Khakurdaha, Narayanitala, Rajapur Korabeg, Sripur, Uttar Durgapur
  - Lok Sabha constituencies: Jaynagar, Jadavpur
  - Vidhan Sabha constituencies: Jaynagar, Baruipur Purba

Area
  - Total: 131.01 km^{2} (50.58 sq mi)

Population (2011)
  - Total: 263,151
  - Density: 2,008.6/km^{2} (5,202.3/sq mi)
  - Urban: 46,322

Demographics
  - Literacy: 73.17 per cent
  - Sex ratio: 950 ♂/♀

Languages
  - Official: Bengali
  - Additional official: English
- Time zone: UTC+05:30 (IST)
- Website: s24pgs.gov.in

Jaynagar I is a community development block that forms an administrative division in Baruipur subdivision of South 24 Parganas district in the Indian state of West Bengal.

== History ==
Dhosa and Tilpi are important archaeological sites in the Jaynagar I CD block. Archaeological excavations at Dhosa and Tilpi, on the bank of the Piyali River indicate the existence of human habitation around 2,000 years ago.

== Geography ==

The Jaynagar I CD block is located at 22°10′31″N 88°25′12″E. It has an average elevation of 8 metres (26 ft).

The Jaynagar I CD block is bounded by the Baruipur CD block in a part of the north, the Canning I CD block in parts of the north and east, the Kultali CD block in a part of the east, the Jaynagar II CD block in the south and the Magrahat II CD block in the west.

The South 24 Parganas district is divided into two distinct physiographic zones: the marine-riverine delta in the north and the marine delta zone in the south. As the sea receded southwards, in the sub-recent geological period, a large low-lying plain got exposed. Both tidal inflows and the rivers have been depositing sediments in this plain. The periodical collapse of both the natural levees and man-made embankments speed up the process of filling up of the depressions containing brackish water wetlands. The marine delta in the south is formed of interlacing tidal channels. As non-saline water for irrigation is scarce, agriculture is monsoon dominated. Some parts of the wetlands are still preserved for raising fish.

The Jaynagar I CD block has an area of 131.01 km^{2} (50.58 sq mi). It has 1 panchayat samity, 12 gram panchayats, 129 gram sansads (village councils), 72 mouzas and 70 inhabited villages, as per the District Statistical Handbook for the South Twenty-four Parganas district. Jaynagar police station serves this CD block. Headquarters of this CD block is at Baharu.

The Gram Panchayats of Jaynagar I CD block/panchayat samiti are: Baharu Kshetra, Bamangachhi, Chaltaberia, Dakshin Barasat, Dhosa Chandaneswar, Harinarayanpur, Jangalia, Khakurdaha, Narayanitala, Rajapur Korabeg, Sripur and Uttar Durgapur.

== Demographics ==
=== Population ===
According to the 2011 Census of India, the Jaynagar I CD block had a total population of 263,151, of which 216,829 were rural and 46,322 were urban. There were 134,966 (51%) males and 128,185 (49%) females. There were 36,293 persons in the age range of 0 to 6 years. The Scheduled Castes numbered 102,645 (39.01%) and the Scheduled Tribes numbered 80 (0.03%).

According to the 2001 Census of India, the Jaynagar I CD block had a total population of 219,009, out of which 113,289 were males and 105,720 were females. The Jaynagar I CD block registered a population growth of 18.21 per cent during the 1991–2001 decade. Decadal growth for South 24 Parganas district was 20.89 per cent. Decadal growth in West Bengal was 17.84 per cent. The Scheduled Castes at 94,849 formed around one-half the population. The Scheduled Tribes numbered 1,204.

Census Towns in the Jaynagar I CD block (2011 census figures in brackets): Raynagar (5,593), Kalikapur Barasat (6,104), Baharu (16,155), Uttarparanij (6,810), Alipur (5,937) and Uttar Durgapur (5,723).

Large villages (with 4,000+ population) in the Jaynagar I CD block (2011 census figures in brackets): Belechandi (2,594), Sarberia (3,154), Padmerhat (5,184), Tajpur Fatepur (6,156), Ramkrishnapur (4,421), Beladanga (4,754), Hogla (2,723), Harinarayanpur (4,025), Jangalia (6,366), Srikrishnanagar (5,064), Purba Gabberia (12,283), Tilpi (13,350), Charaghata (5,837), Rajpur Korabag (7,142), Bantra (12,508), Kamaria (26,575) and Gobindapur (4,890).

Other villages in the Jaynagar I CD block include (2011 census figures in brackets): Dhosa (2,401), Chandaneshwar (3,377), Khakurdaha (3,541), Narayani Tala (2,839) and Sripur (2,668).

=== Literacy ===
According to the 2011 census, the total number of literate persons in the Jaynagar I CD block was 165,987 (73.17% of the population over 6 years) out of which males numbered 93,228 (80.09% of the male population over 6 years) and females numbered 72,759 (65.87% of the female population over 6 years). The gender disparity (the difference between female and male literacy rates) was 14.22%.

According to the 2011 Census of India, literacy in the South 24 Parganas district was 77.51 Literacy in West Bengal was 77.08% in 2011. Literacy in India in 2011 was 74.04%.

According to the 2001 Census of India, the Jaynagar I CD block had a total literacy of 65.77 per cent for the 6+ age group. While male literacy was 77.07 per cent female literacy was 53.57 per cent. The South 24 Parganas district had a total literacy of 69.45 per cent, male literacy being 79.19 per cent and female literacy being 59.01 per cent.

See also – List of West Bengal districts ranked by literacy rate

Literacy in CD blocks of
South 24 Parganas district
Alipore Sadar subdivision
Bishnupur I – 78.33%
Bishnupur II – 81.37%
Budge Budge I – 80.57%
Budge Budge II – 79.13%
Thakurpukur Maheshtala – 83.54%
Baruipur subdivision
Baruipur – 76.46%
Bhangar I – 72.06%
Bhangar II – 74.49%
Jaynagar I – 73.17%
Jaynagar II – 69.71%
Kultali – 69.37%
Sonarpur – 79.70%
Canning subdivision
Basanti – 68.32%
Canning I – 70.76%
Canning II – 66.51%
Gosaba – 78.98%
Diamond Harbour subdivision
Diamond Harbour I – 75.72%
Diamond Harbour II – 76.91%
Falta – 77.17%
Kulpi – 75.49%
Magrahat I – 73.82%
Magrahat II – 77.41%
Mandirbazar – 75.89%
Mathurapur I – 73.93%
Mathurapur II – 77.77%
Kakdwip subdivision
Kakdwip – 77.93%
Namkhana – 85.72
Patharpratima – 82.11%
Sagar – 84.21%
Source: 2011 Census: CD Block Wise
Primary Census Abstract Data

=== Language ===
Languages of Jaynagar I CD block (2011)
1. Bengali (99.9%)
2. Hindi (0.08%)
3. Urdu (0.02%)
4. Others (0.01%)

At the time of the 2011 census, 99.89% of the population spoke Bengali, 0.08% Hindi and 0.02% Urdu as their first language.

=== Religion ===
Religion in Jaynagar I CD block (2011)
Hinduism	53.65%
Islam	45.86%
Other or not stated	0.49%

In the 2011 Census of India, Hindus numbered 140,544 and formed 53.65% of the population in the Jaynagar I CD block. Muslims numbered 123,307 and formed 45.86% of the population. Others numbered 1,300 and formed 0.49% of the population. In 2001, Hindus and Muslims made up 56.43% and 43.46% of the population respectively.

The proportion of Hindus in the South Twenty-four Parganas district has declined from 76.0% in 1961 to 63.2% in 2011. The proportion of Muslims in the South Twenty-four Parganas district has increased from 23.4% to 35.6% during the same period. Christians formed 0.8% in 2011.

== Rural poverty ==
According to the Human Development Report for the South 24 Parganas district, published in 2009, in the Jaynagar I CD block the percentage of households below poverty line was 39.57%. The poverty rates were very high in the Sundarbans settlements with all the thirteen CD blocks registering poverty ratios above 30% and eight CD blocks had more than 40% of the population in the BPL category. The Sundarban region remains the most backward region in terms of quality of life. As per rural household survey in 2005, the proportion of households in South 24 Parganas with poverty rates below poverty line was 34.11%, way above the state and national poverty ratios.

== Economy ==
=== Livelihood ===
Livelihood
in Jaynagar I CD block
1. Cultivators (8.60%)
2. Agricultural labourers (25.1%)
3. Household industries (9.50%)
4. Other Workers (56.8%)

In the Jaynagar I CD block in 2011, among the class of total workers, cultivators numbered 7,677 and formed 8.60%, agricultural labourers numbered 22,378 and formed 25.07%, household industry workers numbered 8,482 and formed 9.50% and other workers numbered 50,711 and formed 56.82%. Total workers numbered 89,248 and formed 33.92% of the total population, and non-workers numbered 173,903 and formed 66.08% of the population.

The District Human Development Report points out that in the CD blocks of the region situated in the close proximity of the Kolkata metropolis, overwhelming majority are involved in the non-agricultural sector for their livelihood. On the other hand, in the Sundarbans settlements, overwhelming majority are dependent on agriculture. In the intermediate region, there is again predominance of the non-agricultural sector. Though the region is not very close to Kolkata, many places are well connected and some industrial/ economic development has taken place.

Note: In the census records a person is considered a cultivator, if the person is engaged in cultivation/ supervision of land owned by self/ government/ institution. When a person who works on another person's land for wages in cash or kind or share, is regarded as an agricultural labourer. Household industry is defined as an industry conducted by one or more members of the family within the household or village, and one that does not qualify for registration as a factory under the Factories Act. Other workers are persons engaged in some economic activity other than cultivators, agricultural labourers and household workers. It includes factory, mining, plantation, transport and office workers, those engaged in business and commerce, teachers, entertainment artistes and so on.

=== Infrastructure ===
There are 65 inhabited villages in the Jaynagar I CD block, as per the District Census Handbook, South Twenty-four Parganas, 2011. 100% villages have power supply. 65 villages (100%) have drinking water supply. 17 villages (26.15%) have post offices. 57 villages (87.69%) have telephones (including landlines, public call offices and mobile phones). 38 villages (58.46%) have pucca (paved) approach roads and 27 villages (41.54%) have transport communication (includes bus service, rail facility and navigable waterways). 2 villages (3.08%) have agricultural credit societies and 5 villages (7.60%) have banks.

=== Agriculture ===
The South 24 Parganas had played a significant role in the Tebhaga movement launched by the Communist Party of India in 1946. Subsequently, Operation Barga was aimed at securing tenancy rights for the peasants. In the Jaynagar I CD block 735.35 acres of land was acquired and vested. Out of this 568.02 acres or 77.24% of the vested land was distributed. The total number of patta (document) holders was 957.

According to the District Human Development Report, agriculture is an important source of livelihood in the South Twentyfour Parganas district. The amount of cultivable land per agricultural worker is only 0.41 hectare in the district. Moreover, the irrigation facilities have not been extended to a satisfactory scale. Agriculture mostly remains a mono-cropped activity.

According to the District Census Handbook, the saline soil of the district is unfit for cultivation, but the non-salty lands are very fertile. While rice is the main food crop, jute is the main cash crop.

In 2013–14, there were 91 fertiliser depots, 22 seed stores and 50 fair price shops in the Jaynagar I CD block.

In 2013–14, the Jaynagar I CD block produced 8,941 tonnes of Aman paddy, the main winter crop, from 4,613 hectares, 643 tonnes of Aus paddy (summer crop) from 249 hectares, 2,905 tonnes of Boro paddy (spring crop) from 862 hectares, 613 tonnes of jute from 29 hectares and 3,510 tonnes of potatoes from 108 hectares. It also produced pulses and oilseeds.

=== Irrigation ===
In the Jaynagar I CD block, in 2013–14, 14.17 hectares were irrigated by deep tube well.

Poor irrigation and high soil salinity results in the mono-cropping pattern of cultivation in a major portion of the South 24 Parganas district. As a result of its closeness to the Bay of Bengal, the river waters are mostly saline and are unsuitable for irrigation. Added to the rather gloomy irrigation scenario is the problem of frequent floods.

=== Pisciculture ===
In the Jaynagar I CD block, in 2013–14, net area under effective pisciculture was 1,185 hectares, engaging 10,757 persons in the profession, and with an approximate annual production of 52,652 quintals.

Pisciculture is an important source of employment in the South 24 Parganas district. As of 2001, more than 4.5 lakh people were engaged in pisciculture. Out of this 2.57 lakhs were from the 13 blocks in the Sundarbans settlements.

=== Banking ===
In 2013–14, the Jaynagar I CD block had offices of 8 commercial banks and 2 gramin banks.

=== Backward Regions Grant Fund ===
The South 24 Parganas district is listed as a backward region and receives financial support from the Backward Regions Grant Fund. The fund, created by the Government of India, is designed to redress regional imbalances in development. As of 2012, 272 districts across the country were listed under this scheme. The list includes 11 districts of West Bengal.

== Transport ==
The Jaynagar I CD block has 2 ferry services and 2 originating/ terminating bus routes.

Hogla, Dakshin Barasat, Baharu and Jaynagar Majilpur are railway stations on the Sealdah South section.

== Education ==
In 2013–14, the Jaynagar I CD block had 107 primary schools with 16,933 students, 5 middle schools with 442 students, 9 high schools with 4,427 students and 14 higher secondary schools with 16,343 students. Jaynagar I CD block had 1 general degree college with 8,381 students and 460 institutions for special and non-formal education with 18,579 students.

See also – Education in India

According to the 2011 census, in Jaynagar I CD block, amongst the 65 inhabited villages, 5 villages did not have a school, 42 villages had two or more primary schools, 22 villages had at least 1 primary and 1 middle school and 15 villages had at least 1 middle and 1 secondary school.

Dhruba Chand Halder College was established in 1965 at Dakshin Barasat.

== Healthcare ==
Certain areas of the South 24 Parganas district have been identified where ground water is affected by Arsenic Contamination. High levels of arsenic in ground water were found in twelve CD blocks of the district. Water samples collected from tubewells in the affected places contained arsenic above the normal level (10 micrograms per litre as specified by the World Health Organization). The affected CD blocks are Baruipur, Bhangar I, Bhangar II, Bishnupur I, Bishnupur II, Basanti, Budge Budge II, Canning I, Canning II, Sonarpur, Magrahat II and Jaynagar I.

In 2014, the Jaynagar I CD block had 1 rural hospital, 2 primary health centres and 7 NGO/ private nursing homes with total 78 beds and 14 doctors (excluding private bodies). It had 50 family welfare subcentres. 4,852 patients were treated indoor and 151,301 patients were treated outdoor in the hospitals, health centres and subcentres of the CD block.

According to the 2011 census, in the Jaynagar I CD block, 1 village had a community health centre, 4 villages had primary health centres, 31 villages had primary health subcentres, 6 villages had maternity and child welfare centres, 2 villages had veterinary hospitals, 11 villages had medicine shops and out of the 65 inhabited villages 16 villages had no medical facilities.

Padmerhat Rural Hospital at Padmerhat with 30 beds is the major government medical facility in the Jaynagar I CD block. There are primary health centres at Momrejgarh (Goalberia) (PO Srikrishnanagar) (with 6 beds) and Purba Gabberia (with 6 beds).
