= Nirmal Mondal =

Indian politician (1955–2021)

Nirmal Chandra Mondal (1955–2021) was an Indian politician from West Bengal. He was a former member of the West Bengal Legislative Assembly from Baruipur Purba Assembly constituency, which was reserved for Scheduled Caste community, in South 24 Parganas district. He won the 2016 West Bengal Legislative Assembly election representing the All India Trinamool Congress. He died of COVID-19 on 30 April 2021.

== Early life and education ==
Mondal was from Dakshin Sonapur village, South 24 Parganas district, West Bengal. He was the son of late Sarada Prasad Mondal. He completed his graduation in arts at a college affiliated with University of Calcutta.

== Career ==
Mondal first became an MLA from Baruipur Purba Assembly constituency representing the All India Trinamool Congress, winning the 2011 West Bengal Legislative Assembly election. He polled 83,636 votes and defeated his nearest rival, Bimal Mistry of the Communist Party of India (Marxist), by a margin of 17,479 votes. He retained the seat for the Trinamool Congress winning the 2016 West Bengal Legislative Assembly election where he polled 92,313 votes and defeated his nearest rival, Sujoy Mistry, also the Communist Party of India (Marxist) candidate by a margin of 20,362 votes.
