= Harinarayanpur Union =

Harinarayanpur Union হরিনারায়ণপুর ইউনিয়ন
- Union
- Harinarayanpur Union
- Location within Bangladesh
- Coordinates: 23.7592°N 89.1413°E
- Country: Bangladesh
- Division: Khulna
- District: Kushtia
- Upazila: Kushtia Sadar
- headquarter: Harinarayanpur

Area
  - Total: 15.85 km^{2} (6.12 sq mi)

Population (2011)
  - Total: 21,920
  - Density: 1,383/km^{2} (3,582/sq mi)
- Time zone: UTC+6 (BST)
- Website: 12noharinarayanpurup.kushtia.gov.bd

Harinarayanpur Union (Bengali: হরিনারায়ণপুর ইউনিয়ন) is a union parishad situated at Kushtia Sadar Upazila, in Kushtia District, Khulna Division of Bangladesh. The union has an area of 15.85 square kilometres (6.12 sq mi) and as of 2001 had a population of 21,920. There are 7 villages and 5 mouzas in the union.
