= Baruipur Purba Assembly constituency =

West Bengal Legislative Assembly Constituency

Baruipur Purba
- Constituency No. 137 for the West Bengal Legislative Assembly
- Interactive Map Outlining Baruipur Purba Assembly Constituency

Constituency details
- Country: India
- Region: East India
- State: West Bengal
- District: South 24 Parganas
- Lok Sabha constituency: Jadavpur
- Established: 1951
- Total electors: 265,045
- Reservation: SC

Member of Legislative Assembly
- 18th West Bengal Legislative Assembly
- Incumbent Bivas Sardar
- Party: AITC
- Alliance: AITC+
- Elected year: 2021

Baruipur Purba Assembly constituency is a Legislative Assembly constituency of South 24 Parganas district in the Indian State of West Bengal. It is reserved for Scheduled Castes.

== Overview ==
As per order of the Delimitation Commission in respect of the Delimitation of constituencies in the West Bengal, Baruipur Purba Assembly constituency is composed of the following:

- Begumpur, Belegachhia, Brindakhali, Champahati, Hardhah, Nabagram, Ramnagar-I, Ramnagar-II and South Garia gram panchayats of Baruipur community development block
- Bamangachhi, Chaltaberia, Dhosa Chandaneswar, Jangalia, Khakurdaha and Narayanitala gram panchayats of Jaynagar I community development block

Baruipur Purba Assembly constituency is a part of No. 22 Jadavpur Lok Sabha constituency.

== Members of the Legislative Assembly ==
Year	Member	Party
Baruipur
1952	Lalit Kumar Sinha	Communist Party of India
1952	Abdus Shukur	Indian National Congress
1957	Khagendra Kumar Roy Choudhury	Communist Party of India
1957	Gangadhar Naskar	Communist Party of India
1962	Sakti Kumar Sarkar	Indian National Congress
1967	Kumud Ranjan Mondal	Samyukta Socialist Party
1969	Kumud Ranjan Mondal	Samyukta Socialist Party
1971	Bimal Mistry	Communist Party of India (Marxist)
1972	Lalit Gayen	Indian National Congress
1977	Hemen Majumdar	Communist Party of India (Marxist)
1982	Hemen Majumdar	Communist Party of India (Marxist)
1987	Hemen Majumdar	Communist Party of India (Marxist)
1991	Sovandeb Chattopadhyay	Indian National Congress
1996	Sovandeb Chattopadhyay	Indian National Congress
1998^	Sujan Chakraborty	Communist Party of India (Marxist)
2001	Arup Bhadra	Trinamool Congress
2006	Rahul Ghosh	Communist Party of India (Marxist)
Baruipur Purba
2011	Nirmal Mondal	Trinamool Congress
2016	Nirmal Mondal	Trinamool Congress
2021	Bivas Sardar	Trinamool Congress
2026	Bivas Sardar	Trinamool Congress

- ^ denotes by-election

== Election results ==
=== 2026 ===
2026 West Bengal Legislative Assembly election: Baruipur Purba
Party	Candidate	Votes	%	±%
AITC	Bivas Sardar	120,987	50.98	▼3.77
BJP	Tumpa Sardar	89,172	37.57	▲4.87
CPI(M)	Swapan Naskar	19,649	8.28	▼1.26
NOTA	None of the above	1,683	0.71	▼0.11
Majority		31,815	13.41	▼8.64
Turnout		237,319	96.8	▲11.88
AITC hold		Swing		

=== 2021 ===
2021 West Bengal Legislative Assembly election: Baruipur Purba
Party	Candidate	Votes	%	±%
AITC	Bivas Sardar	123,243	54.75	▲6.66
BJP	Chandan Mondal	73,602	32.7	▲26.06
CPI(M)	Swapan Naskar	21,467	9.54	▼27.94
NOTA	None of the above	1,855	0.82	
Majority		49,641	22.05	
Turnout		225,114	84.92	
AITC hold		Swing		

=== 2016 ===
2016 West Bengal state assembly election: Baruipur Purba
Party	Candidate	Votes	%	±%
AITC	Nirmal Mondal	92,313	48.09	▼4.1
CPI(M)	Sujoy Mistry	71,951	37.48	▼3.18
BJP	Amulya Kumar Naskar	12,738	6.64	▲3.25
SUCI(C)	Ajay Saha	9,230	4.81	New entry
NOTA	None of the above	2,026	1.06	New entry
Majority		20,362	10.61	▼0.92
Turnout		1,91,966	86.24	▲1.47
AITC hold		Swing		

=== 2011 ===
2011 West Bengal state assembly election: Baruipur Purba
Party	Candidate	Votes	%	±%
AITC	Nirmal Mondal	83,636	52.19	
CPI(M)	Bimal Mistry	65,157	40.66	
BJP	Tapas Naskar	5,432	3.39	
BSP	Sukumar Mandal	1,721	1.07	
Independent	Shibdas Naskar	1,627	1.02	
Independent	Pramod Mondal	1,429	0.89	
PDS	Rabindra Nath Mistri	1,239	0.77	
Majority		18,479	11.53	
Turnout		1,60,241	84.77	
AITC win (new seat)				

=== 2006 ===
2006 West Bengal Legislative Assembly election: Baruipur
Party	Candidate	Votes	%	±%
CPI(M)	Rahul Ghosh	80,540	47.34	+0.07
AITC	Arup Bhadra	76,633	45.05	−2.22
INC	Dulal Halder	6,651	3.91	
Independent	Sandipan Mahapatra	2,313	1.36	
Independent	Abu Taleb Mondal	1,666	0.98	
Majority		3,907	2.29	+2.29
Turnout		170,120		
CPI(M) gain from AITC		Swing		

=== 2001 ===
2001 West Bengal Legislative Assembly election: Baruipur
Party	Candidate	Votes	%	±%
AITC	Arup Bhadra	71,340	47.27	
CPI(M)	Dr. Sujan Chakraborty	71,335	47.27	
BJP	Gopal Chandra Ghosh	3,638	2.41	
Independent	Chitta Ranjan Hajra	1,668	1.11	
Party for Democratic Socialism	Anich Gazi	1,449	0.96	
Majority		5	0.00	
Turnout		150,919	75.75	
AITC gain from CPI(M)		Swing		

=== 1977-1996 ===
Sovandeb Chattopadhyay of INC defeated Sujan Chakraborty of CPI(M) in 1996 and Hemen Majumdar of CPI(M) in 1991. Hemen Majumdar of CPI(M) defeated Arup Bhadra of INC in 1987, Jalil Gazi of INC in 1982 and Ram Kanta Mondal of INC in 1977.

=== 1972 ===
Lalit Gayen of INC won in 1972. Bimal Mistry of CPI(M) won in 1971. Kumud Ranjan Mondal of SSP won in 1969 and 1967. Sakti Kumar Sarkar of INC won in 1962. In 1957 and 1952, Baruipur Assembly constituency had joint seats. Khagendra Kumar Roy Choudhury and Gangadhar Naskar, both of CPI, won in 1957. In 1952, Lalit Kumar Sinha of CPI and Abdus Shukur of INC, won.
