= State Highway 1 (West Bengal) =

Highway in West Bengal, India

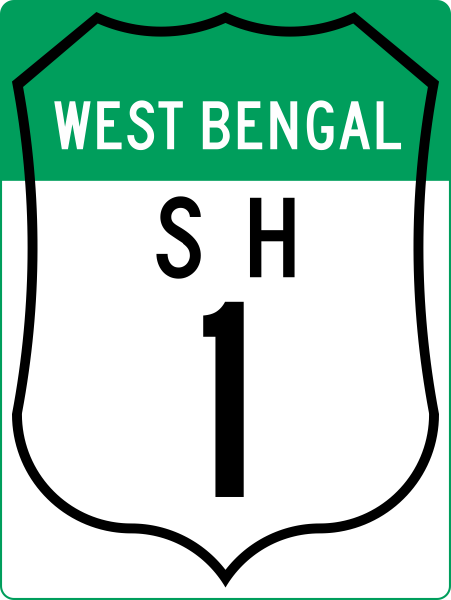
State Highway 1
- Map of the State Highway in red

Route information
- Length: 151 km (94 mi)

Major junctions
- From: Bangaon junction with NH 112 and SH 3
- NH 12 from Chhatimtala to Birohi Bazar; SH 2 (Barrackpore Trunk Road) from Barrackpore to Kolkata; NH 12 from Barasat to Rajarhat; NH 12 from Sector 5 link-EM Bypass crossing Netaji Subhash Chandra Bose Road from Garia to Rajpur; SH 1 from Baruipur to Jaynagar Majilpur
- To: Kulpi junction with NH 12

Location
- Country: India
- State: West Bengal
- Districts: North 24 Parganas, Nadia, South 24 Parganas

Highway system
- Roads in India; Expressways; National; State; Asian; State Highways in West Bengal
→ SH 2

State Highway 1 (West Bengal) is a state highway in West Bengal, India.

== Route ==
SH 1 originates from Bangaon and passes through Chakdaha, Madanpur, Kalyani, Halisahar, Naihati, Ichapore, Barrackpore, Kolkata, Jadavpur, Garia, Rajpur Sonarpur, Baruipur, Jaynagar Majilpur and terminates at Kulpi.

The total length of SH 1 is 151 km.

Districts traversed by SH 1 are:
North 24 Parganas district (0 - 32 km)
Nadia district (32-91 km)
South 24 Parganas (91-151 km)

== Road sections ==
It is divided into different sections as follows:

Road Section	District	CD Block	Length (km)
Bongaon-Chakdaha	North 24 Parganas, Nadia	Bangaon, Chakdaha	30
Chakdaha-Birohi via NH 12	Nadia	-	-
Birohi-Madanpur-Kalyani	Nadia	-	14
Kalyani-Barrackpore	Nadia, North 24 Parganas	Barrackpore I	27
Barrackpore-Kolkata via Barrackpore Trunk Road	North 24 Parganas	Barrackpore II	18
Jadavpur-Garia-Baruipur-Jaynagar-Kulpi	Kolkata & South 24 Parganas	Sonarpur, Baruipur, Jaynagar I, Mandirbazar, Mathurapur I, Kulpi	60

== See also ==
- List of state highways in West Bengal
